This is a partial list of unnumbered minor planets for principal provisional designations assigned during 16–31 March 2001. Since this period yielded a high number of provisional discoveries, it is further split into several standalone pages. , a total of 478 bodies remain unnumbered for this period. Objects for this year are listed on the following pages: A–E · Fi · Fii · G–O · P–R · S · T · U · V–W and X–Y. Also see previous and next year.

F 

|- id="2001 FB217" bgcolor=#d6d6d6
| – ||  || MBA-O || 18.2 || 1.3 km || single || 10 days || 31 Mar 2001 || 17 || align=left | Disc.: Kitt Peak Obs. || 
|- id="2001 FC217" bgcolor=#d6d6d6
| 2 ||  || MBA-O || 17.97 || 1.4 km || multiple || 2001-2022 || 18 Oct 2022 || 53 || align=left | Disc.: Kitt Peak Obs.Alt.: 2021 GP181 || 
|- id="2001 FD217" bgcolor=#d6d6d6G
 – ||  || MBA-O || 17.6 || 1.7 km || single || 10 days || 31 Mar 2001 || 16 || align=left | Disc.: Kitt Peak Obs. || 
|- id="2001 FE217" bgcolor=#d6d6d6
| 0 ||  || MBA-O || 17.7 || 1.6 km || multiple || 2001–2021 || 18 Jan 2021 || 75 || align=left | Disc.: Kitt Peak Obs. || 
|- id="2001 FF217" bgcolor=#fefefe
| 5 ||  || MBA-I || 19.1 || data-sort-value="0.45" | 450 m || multiple || 2001–2015 || 12 Aug 2015 || 17 || align=left | Disc.: Kitt Peak Obs.Alt.: 2015 PC242 || 
|- id="2001 FH217" bgcolor=#E9E9E9
| 0 ||  || MBA-M || 18.12 || data-sort-value="0.67" | 1.2 km || multiple || 2001-2021 || 29 Nov 2021 || 37 || align=left | Disc.: Kitt Peak Obs.Alt.: 2019 GL139 || 
|- id="2001 FJ217" bgcolor=#E9E9E9
| – ||  || MBA-M || 18.6 || data-sort-value="0.80" | 800 m || single || 10 days || 31 Mar 2001 || 19 || align=left | Disc.: Kitt Peak Obs. || 
|- id="2001 FK217" bgcolor=#E9E9E9
| 0 ||  || MBA-M || 17.82 || 1.1 km || multiple || 1994–2022 || 25 Jan 2022 || 116 || align=left | Disc.: SpacewatchAlt.: 1994 TF4, 2005 GX183, 2007 RH91 || 
|- id="2001 FL217" bgcolor=#fefefe
| – ||  || MBA-I || 20.9 || data-sort-value="0.20" | 200 m || single || 2 days || 23 Mar 2001 || 10 || align=left | Disc.: Kitt Peak Obs. || 
|- id="2001 FN217" bgcolor=#d6d6d6
| – ||  || MBA-O || 20.1 || data-sort-value="0.53" | 530 m || single || 10 days || 31 Mar 2001 || 17 || align=left | Disc.: Kitt Peak Obs. || 
|- id="2001 FO217" bgcolor=#E9E9E9
| – ||  || MBA-M || 19.1 || data-sort-value="0.84" | 840 m || single || 2 days || 23 Mar 2001 || 10 || align=left | Disc.: Kitt Peak Obs. || 
|- id="2001 FP217" bgcolor=#d6d6d6
| – ||  || MBA-O || 18.7 || 1.0 km || single || 4 days || 25 Mar 2001 || 10 || align=left | Disc.: Kitt Peak Obs. || 
|- id="2001 FQ217" bgcolor=#E9E9E9
| 0 ||  || MBA-M || 17.9 || 1.1 km || multiple || 2001–2020 || 21 Oct 2020 || 64 || align=left | Disc.: Kitt Peak Obs. || 
|- id="2001 FR217" bgcolor=#E9E9E9
| – ||  || MBA-M || 20.1 || data-sort-value="0.53" | 530 m || single || 2 days || 23 Mar 2001 || 10 || align=left | Disc.: Kitt Peak Obs. || 
|- id="2001 FS217" bgcolor=#d6d6d6
| – ||  || MBA-O || 20.1 || data-sort-value="0.53" | 530 m || single || 8 days || 29 Mar 2001 || 14 || align=left | Disc.: Kitt Peak Obs. || 
|- id="2001 FT217" bgcolor=#d6d6d6
| – ||  || MBA-O || 18.6 || 1.1 km || single || 10 days || 31 Mar 2001 || 24 || align=left | Disc.: Kitt Peak Obs. || 
|- id="2001 FU217" bgcolor=#E9E9E9
| 0 ||  || MBA-M || 18.44 || data-sort-value="0.88" | 880 m || multiple || 2001-2022 || 01 Mar 2022 || 50 || align=left | Disc.: Kitt Peak Obs.Alt.: 2022 Au32 || 
|- id="2001 FV217" bgcolor=#fefefe
| – ||  || MBA-I || 20.7 || data-sort-value="0.22" | 220 m || single || 10 days || 31 Mar 2001 || 20 || align=left | Disc.: Kitt Peak Obs. || 
|- id="2001 FW217" bgcolor=#fefefe
| 0 ||  || MBA-I || 19.64 || data-sort-value="0.35" | 350 m || multiple || 2001–2021 || 02 Oct 2021 || 38 || align=left | Disc.: Kitt Peak Obs. || 
|- id="2001 FX217" bgcolor=#fefefe
| – ||  || MBA-I || 20.9 || data-sort-value="0.20" | 200 m || single || 9 days || 30 Mar 2001 || 16 || align=left | Disc.: Kitt Peak Obs. || 
|- id="2001 FY217" bgcolor=#d6d6d6
| – ||  || MBA-O || 18.9 || data-sort-value="0.92" | 920 m || single || 10 days || 31 Mar 2001 || 19 || align=left | Disc.: Kitt Peak Obs. || 
|- id="2001 FZ217" bgcolor=#fefefe
| – ||  || MBA-I || 20.8 || data-sort-value="0.21" | 210 m || single || 9 days || 30 Mar 2001 || 13 || align=left | Disc.: Kitt Peak Obs. || 
|- id="2001 FB218" bgcolor=#E9E9E9
| – ||  || MBA-M || 18.4 || data-sort-value="0.88" | 880 m || single || 9 days || 30 Mar 2001 || 10 || align=left | Disc.: Kitt Peak Obs. || 
|- id="2001 FC218" bgcolor=#E9E9E9
| 0 ||  || MBA-M || 17.67 || 1.6 km || multiple || 2001–2021 || 29 Oct 2021 || 68 || align=left | Disc.: Kitt Peak Obs. || 
|- id="2001 FD218" bgcolor=#fefefe
| 0 ||  || MBA-I || 18.7 || data-sort-value="0.54" | 540 m || multiple || 2001–2020 || 28 Apr 2020 || 55 || align=left | Disc.: Kitt Peak Obs. || 
|- id="2001 FE218" bgcolor=#E9E9E9
| 0 ||  || MBA-M || 18.4 || data-sort-value="0.88" | 880 m || multiple || 2001–2020 || 15 Oct 2020 || 60 || align=left | Disc.: Kitt Peak Obs.Alt.: 2016 UP120 || 
|- id="2001 FG218" bgcolor=#E9E9E9
| – ||  || MBA-M || 19.9 || data-sort-value="0.58" | 580 m || single || 2 days || 23 Mar 2001 || 10 || align=left | Disc.: Kitt Peak Obs. || 
|- id="2001 FH218" bgcolor=#d6d6d6
| – ||  || MBA-O || 19.2 || data-sort-value="0.80" | 800 m || single || 4 days || 25 Mar 2001 || 12 || align=left | Disc.: Kitt Peak Obs. || 
|- id="2001 FJ218" bgcolor=#E9E9E9
| – ||  || MBA-M || 19.6 || data-sort-value="0.51" | 510 m || single || 10 days || 31 Mar 2001 || 18 || align=left | Disc.: Kitt Peak Obs. || 
|- id="2001 FK218" bgcolor=#E9E9E9
| 3 ||  || MBA-M || 18.7 || data-sort-value="0.76" | 760 m || multiple || 2001–2020 || 17 Oct 2020 || 39 || align=left | Disc.: Kitt Peak Obs.Alt.: 2020 RB35 || 
|- id="2001 FL218" bgcolor=#fefefe
| 0 ||  || MBA-I || 19.10 || data-sort-value="0.45" | 450 m || multiple || 2001–2022 || 27 Jan 2022 || 46 || align=left | Disc.: Kitt Peak Obs. || 
|- id="2001 FN218" bgcolor=#fefefe
| – ||  || MBA-I || 19.8 || data-sort-value="0.33" | 330 m || single || 10 days || 31 Mar 2001 || 22 || align=left | Disc.: Kitt Peak Obs. || 
|- id="2001 FO218" bgcolor=#fefefe
| 0 ||  || MBA-I || 18.7 || data-sort-value="0.54" | 540 m || multiple || 2001–2020 || 22 Apr 2020 || 60 || align=left | Disc.: Kitt Peak Obs. || 
|- id="2001 FP218" bgcolor=#fefefe
| – ||  || MBA-I || 21.0 || data-sort-value="0.19" | 190 m || single || 10 days || 31 Mar 2001 || 16 || align=left | Disc.: Kitt Peak Obs. || 
|- id="2001 FQ218" bgcolor=#fefefe
| – ||  || MBA-I || 20.0 || data-sort-value="0.30" | 300 m || single || 10 days || 31 Mar 2001 || 22 || align=left | Disc.: Kitt Peak Obs. || 
|- id="2001 FR218" bgcolor=#E9E9E9
| 0 ||  || MBA-M || 18.3 || data-sort-value="0.92" | 920 m || multiple || 2001–2019 || 29 Jul 2019 || 48 || align=left | Disc.: Kitt Peak Obs. || 
|- id="2001 FS218" bgcolor=#E9E9E9
| – ||  || MBA-M || 18.3 || data-sort-value="0.92" | 920 m || single || 10 days || 31 Mar 2001 || 13 || align=left | Disc.: Kitt Peak Obs. || 
|- id="2001 FT218" bgcolor=#fefefe
| – ||  || MBA-I || 19.7 || data-sort-value="0.34" | 340 m || single || 10 days || 31 Mar 2001 || 20 || align=left | Disc.: Kitt Peak Obs. || 
|- id="2001 FV218" bgcolor=#d6d6d6
| – ||  || MBA-O || 17.3 || 1.9 km || single || 9 days || 30 Mar 2001 || 17 || align=left | Disc.: Kitt Peak Obs. || 
|- id="2001 FX218" bgcolor=#E9E9E9
| – ||  || MBA-M || 18.1 || 1.3 km || single || 10 days || 31 Mar 2001 || 13 || align=left | Disc.: Kitt Peak Obs. || 
|- id="2001 FY218" bgcolor=#fefefe
| 0 ||  || MBA-I || 19.18 || data-sort-value="0.43" | 430 m || multiple || 2001–2021 || 30 Nov 2021 || 72 || align=left | Disc.: Kitt Peak Obs. || 
|- id="2001 FZ218" bgcolor=#E9E9E9
| 0 ||  || MBA-M || 18.23 || data-sort-value="0.80" | 1.2 km || multiple || 2001-2022 || 26 Jan 2022 || 50 || align=left | Disc.: Kitt Peak Obs.Alt.: 2012 TB6 || 
|- id="2001 FB219" bgcolor=#E9E9E9
| 1 ||  || MBA-M || 18.26 || 1.2 km || multiple || 2001–2020 || 07 Sep 2020 || 41 || align=left | Disc.: Kitt Peak Obs. || 
|- id="2001 FD219" bgcolor=#d6d6d6
| – ||  || MBA-O || 18.8 || data-sort-value="0.97" | 970 m || single || 10 days || 31 Mar 2001 || 14 || align=left | Disc.: Kitt Peak Obs. || 
|- id="2001 FE219" bgcolor=#d6d6d6
| – ||  || MBA-O || 18.8 || data-sort-value="0.97" | 970 m || single || 10 days || 31 Mar 2001 || 14 || align=left | Disc.: Kitt Peak Obs. || 
|- id="2001 FF219" bgcolor=#d6d6d6
| – ||  || MBA-O || 17.9 || 1.5 km || single || 4 days || 25 Mar 2001 || 12 || align=left | Disc.: Kitt Peak Obs. || 
|- id="2001 FG219" bgcolor=#E9E9E9
| – ||  || MBA-M || 20.9 || data-sort-value="0.20" | 200 m || single || 8 days || 29 Mar 2001 || 14 || align=left | Disc.: Kitt Peak Obs. || 
|- id="2001 FH219" bgcolor=#d6d6d6
| 0 ||  || MBA-O || 17.48 || 1.8 km || multiple || 1998–2021 || 14 May 2021 || 171 || align=left | Disc.: Kitt Peak Obs. || 
|- id="2001 FJ219" bgcolor=#E9E9E9
| – ||  || MBA-M || 18.1 || 1.3 km || single || 9 days || 30 Mar 2001 || 10 || align=left | Disc.: Kitt Peak Obs. || 
|- id="2001 FM219" bgcolor=#d6d6d6
| 6 ||  || MBA-O || 19.9 || data-sort-value="0.58" | 580 m || multiple || 2001–2009 || 19 Nov 2009 || 16 || align=left | Disc.: Kitt Peak Obs. || 
|- id="2001 FN219" bgcolor=#E9E9E9
| – ||  || MBA-M || 19.1 || data-sort-value="0.64" | 640 m || single || 2 days || 23 Mar 2001 || 10 || align=left | Disc.: Kitt Peak Obs. || 
|- id="2001 FP219" bgcolor=#E9E9E9
| E ||  || MBA-M || 19.2 || data-sort-value="0.61" | 610 m || single || 10 days || 31 Mar 2001 || 13 || align=left | Disc.: Kitt Peak Obs. || 
|- id="2001 FQ219" bgcolor=#fefefe
| 3 ||  || MBA-I || 19.0 || data-sort-value="0.47" | 470 m || multiple || 2001–2020 || 15 Oct 2020 || 39 || align=left | Disc.: Kitt Peak Obs.Alt.: 2020 RC32 || 
|- id="2001 FR219" bgcolor=#fefefe
| – ||  || MBA-I || 20.3 || data-sort-value="0.26" | 260 m || single || 10 days || 31 Mar 2001 || 14 || align=left | Disc.: Kitt Peak Obs. || 
|- id="2001 FS219" bgcolor=#d6d6d6
| 0 ||  || MBA-O || 17.81 || 1.5 km || multiple || 2001–2021 || 14 Jun 2021 || 66 || align=left | Disc.: Kitt Peak Obs. || 
|- id="2001 FT219" bgcolor=#d6d6d6
| 0 ||  || MBA-O || 17.4 || 1.8 km || multiple || 2001–2018 || 08 Nov 2018 || 48 || align=left | Disc.: Kitt Peak Obs. || 
|- id="2001 FU219" bgcolor=#E9E9E9
| – ||  || MBA-M || 19.1 || data-sort-value="0.64" | 640 m || single || 9 days || 30 Mar 2001 || 17 || align=left | Disc.: Kitt Peak Obs. || 
|- id="2001 FV219" bgcolor=#fefefe
| 0 ||  || MBA-I || 18.41 || data-sort-value="0.62" | 620 m || multiple || 2001–2021 || 27 Nov 2021 || 165 || align=left | Disc.: Kitt Peak Obs. || 
|- id="2001 FW219" bgcolor=#d6d6d6
| – ||  || MBA-O || 17.5 || 1.8 km || single || 2 days || 23 Mar 2001 || 10 || align=left | Disc.: Kitt Peak Obs. || 
|- id="2001 FY219" bgcolor=#fefefe
| – ||  || MBA-I || 20.2 || data-sort-value="0.27" | 270 m || single || 10 days || 31 Mar 2001 || 17 || align=left | Disc.: Kitt Peak Obs. || 
|- id="2001 FZ219" bgcolor=#fefefe
| – ||  || MBA-I || 20.6 || data-sort-value="0.23" | 230 m || single || 10 days || 31 Mar 2001 || 13 || align=left | Disc.: Kitt Peak Obs. || 
|- id="2001 FA220" bgcolor=#fefefe
| 1 ||  || MBA-I || 18.8 || data-sort-value="0.52" | 520 m || multiple || 2001–2020 || 05 Nov 2020 || 73 || align=left | Disc.: Kitt Peak Obs. || 
|- id="2001 FB220" bgcolor=#fefefe
| – ||  || MBA-I || 20.4 || data-sort-value="0.25" | 250 m || single || 2 days || 23 Mar 2001 || 10 || align=left | Disc.: Kitt Peak Obs. || 
|- id="2001 FC220" bgcolor=#fefefe
| – ||  || MBA-I || 20.1 || data-sort-value="0.28" | 280 m || single || 10 days || 31 Mar 2001 || 20 || align=left | Disc.: Kitt Peak Obs. || 
|- id="2001 FD220" bgcolor=#d6d6d6
| – ||  || MBA-O || 18.5 || 1.1 km || single || 2 days || 23 Mar 2001 || 10 || align=left | Disc.: Kitt Peak Obs. || 
|- id="2001 FE220" bgcolor=#d6d6d6
| – ||  || MBA-O || 17.3 || 1.9 km || single || 2 days || 23 Mar 2001 || 10 || align=left | Disc.: Kitt Peak Obs. || 
|- id="2001 FG220" bgcolor=#E9E9E9
| – ||  || MBA-M || 18.3 || 1.2 km || single || 2 days || 23 Mar 2001 || 10 || align=left | Disc.: Kitt Peak Obs. || 
|- id="2001 FJ220" bgcolor=#E9E9E9
| – ||  || MBA-M || 18.3 || data-sort-value="0.92" | 920 m || single || 9 days || 30 Mar 2001 || 17 || align=left | Disc.: Kitt Peak Obs. || 
|- id="2001 FK220" bgcolor=#fefefe
| – ||  || MBA-I || 19.1 || data-sort-value="0.45" | 450 m || single || 10 days || 31 Mar 2001 || 20 || align=left | Disc.: Kitt Peak Obs. || 
|- id="2001 FL220" bgcolor=#fefefe
| 1 ||  || MBA-I || 19.5 || data-sort-value="0.37" | 370 m || multiple || 2001–2018 || 17 Aug 2018 || 30 || align=left | Disc.: Kitt Peak Obs. || 
|- id="2001 FM220" bgcolor=#fefefe
| – ||  || MBA-I || 20.2 || data-sort-value="0.27" | 270 m || single || 9 days || 30 Mar 2001 || 17 || align=left | Disc.: Kitt Peak Obs. || 
|- id="2001 FN220" bgcolor=#E9E9E9
| – ||  || MBA-M || 19.1 || data-sort-value="0.45" | 450 m || single || 8 days || 30 Mar 2001 || 13 || align=left | Disc.: Kitt Peak Obs. || 
|- id="2001 FO220" bgcolor=#d6d6d6
| 2 ||  || MBA-O || 17.4 || 1.8 km || multiple || 2001–2018 || 11 Aug 2018 || 55 || align=left | Disc.: Kitt Peak Obs. || 
|- id="2001 FP220" bgcolor=#d6d6d6
| 0 ||  || MBA-O || 18.07 || 1.4 km || multiple || 2001-2021 || 12 Jun 2021 || 43 || align=left | Disc.: Kitt Peak Obs.Alt.: 2013 RS132, 2015 CY72, 2015 DE6  || 
|- id="2001 FS220" bgcolor=#fefefe
| – ||  || MBA-I || 20.7 || data-sort-value="0.22" | 220 m || single || 7 days || 29 Mar 2001 || 11 || align=left | Disc.: Kitt Peak Obs. || 
|- id="2001 FT220" bgcolor=#fefefe
| – ||  || MBA-I || 20.9 || data-sort-value="0.20" | 200 m || single || 7 days || 29 Mar 2001 || 10 || align=left | Disc.: Kitt Peak Obs. || 
|- id="2001 FU220" bgcolor=#d6d6d6
| – ||  || MBA-O || 17.4 || 1.8 km || single || 9 days || 31 Mar 2001 || 18 || align=left | Disc.: Kitt Peak Obs. || 
|- id="2001 FV220" bgcolor=#E9E9E9
| – ||  || MBA-M || 19.2 || data-sort-value="0.61" | 610 m || single || 9 days || 31 Mar 2001 || 15 || align=left | Disc.: Kitt Peak Obs. || 
|- id="2001 FW220" bgcolor=#d6d6d6
| – ||  || MBA-O || 17.9 || 1.5 km || single || 8 days || 30 Mar 2001 || 10 || align=left | Disc.: Kitt Peak Obs. || 
|- id="2001 FX220" bgcolor=#d6d6d6
| – ||  || MBA-O || 17.9 || 1.5 km || single || 7 days || 29 Mar 2001 || 10 || align=left | Disc.: Kitt Peak Obs. || 
|- id="2001 FY220" bgcolor=#E9E9E9
| – ||  || MBA-M || 19.5 || data-sort-value="0.53" | 530 m || single || 9 days || 31 Mar 2001 || 11 || align=left | Disc.: Kitt Peak Obs. || 
|- id="2001 FZ220" bgcolor=#fefefe
| 0 ||  || MBA-I || 17.9 || data-sort-value="0.78" | 780 m || multiple || 2001–2020 || 15 Dec 2020 || 103 || align=left | Disc.: Kitt Peak Obs. || 
|- id="2001 FA221" bgcolor=#E9E9E9
| 0 ||  || MBA-M || 18.0 || data-sort-value="0.75" | 750 m || multiple || 1994–2019 || 05 Nov 2019 || 59 || align=left | Disc.: Kitt Peak Obs.Alt.: 2014 KM65 || 
|- id="2001 FB221" bgcolor=#E9E9E9
| 0 ||  || MBA-M || 17.78 || 1.5 km || multiple || 2001–2021 || 09 Aug 2021 || 50 || align=left | Disc.: Kitt Peak Obs. || 
|- id="2001 FC221" bgcolor=#E9E9E9
| – ||  || MBA-M || 21.1 || data-sort-value="0.25" | 250 m || single || 8 days || 30 Mar 2001 || 9 || align=left | Disc.: Kitt Peak Obs. || 
|- id="2001 FD221" bgcolor=#d6d6d6
| – ||  || MBA-O || 17.9 || 1.5 km || single || 7 days || 29 Mar 2001 || 10 || align=left | Disc.: Kitt Peak Obs. || 
|- id="2001 FE221" bgcolor=#E9E9E9
| – ||  || MBA-M || 19.7 || data-sort-value="0.64" | 640 m || single || 7 days || 29 Mar 2001 || 11 || align=left | Disc.: Kitt Peak Obs. || 
|- id="2001 FF221" bgcolor=#d6d6d6
| – ||  || MBA-O || 18.6 || 1.1 km || single || 9 days || 31 Mar 2001 || 15 || align=left | Disc.: Kitt Peak Obs. || 
|- id="2001 FG221" bgcolor=#E9E9E9
| – ||  || MBA-M || 18.8 || data-sort-value="0.73" | 730 m || single || 9 days || 31 Mar 2001 || 14 || align=left | Disc.: Kitt Peak Obs. || 
|- id="2001 FH221" bgcolor=#fefefe
| – ||  || MBA-I || 20.0 || data-sort-value="0.30" | 300 m || single || 8 days || 30 Mar 2001 || 13 || align=left | Disc.: Kitt Peak Obs. || 
|- id="2001 FK221" bgcolor=#E9E9E9
| 1 ||  || MBA-M || 17.7 || 1.2 km || multiple || 2001–2020 || 11 Nov 2020 || 121 || align=left | Disc.: Kitt Peak Obs. || 
|- id="2001 FL221" bgcolor=#fefefe
| 2 ||  || MBA-I || 18.8 || data-sort-value="0.52" | 520 m || multiple || 2001–2020 || 15 Oct 2020 || 50 || align=left | Disc.: Kitt Peak Obs.Alt.: 2013 TS202 || 
|- id="2001 FM221" bgcolor=#d6d6d6
| 0 ||  || MBA-O || 16.7 || 2.5 km || multiple || 2001–2019 || 25 Nov 2019 || 76 || align=left | Disc.: Kitt Peak Obs.Alt.: 2003 TE46 || 
|- id="2001 FN221" bgcolor=#fefefe
| – ||  || MBA-I || 20.5 || data-sort-value="0.24" | 240 m || single || 9 days || 31 Mar 2001 || 14 || align=left | Disc.: Kitt Peak Obs. || 
|- id="2001 FO221" bgcolor=#d6d6d6
| – ||  || MBA-O || 19.1 || data-sort-value="0.84" | 840 m || single || 7 days || 29 Mar 2001 || 10 || align=left | Disc.: Kitt Peak Obs. || 
|- id="2001 FP221" bgcolor=#d6d6d6
| – ||  || MBA-O || 18.3 || 1.2 km || single || 7 days || 29 Mar 2001 || 11 || align=left | Disc.: Kitt Peak Obs. || 
|- id="2001 FQ221" bgcolor=#E9E9E9
| 0 ||  || MBA-M || 18.2 || data-sort-value="0.68" | 680 m || multiple || 2001–2019 || 25 Jul 2019 || 57 || align=left | Disc.: Kitt Peak Obs. || 
|- id="2001 FS221" bgcolor=#d6d6d6
| 4 ||  || MBA-O || 17.6 || 1.7 km || multiple || 2001–2019 || 27 Oct 2019 || 29 || align=left | Disc.: Kitt Peak Obs. || 
|- id="2001 FU221" bgcolor=#fefefe
| – ||  || MBA-I || 20.7 || data-sort-value="0.22" | 220 m || single || 7 days || 29 Mar 2001 || 10 || align=left | Disc.: Kitt Peak Obs. || 
|- id="2001 FW221" bgcolor=#d6d6d6
| – ||  || MBA-O || 18.4 || 1.2 km || single || 9 days || 31 Mar 2001 || 14 || align=left | Disc.: Kitt Peak Obs. || 
|- id="2001 FX221" bgcolor=#d6d6d6
| 1 ||  || MBA-O || 17.8 || 1.5 km || multiple || 2001–2019 || 22 Oct 2019 || 56 || align=left | Disc.: Kitt Peak Obs. || 
|- id="2001 FY221" bgcolor=#d6d6d6
| – ||  || MBA-O || 19.2 || data-sort-value="0.80" | 800 m || single || 8 days || 30 Mar 2001 || 10 || align=left | Disc.: Kitt Peak Obs. || 
|- id="2001 FZ221" bgcolor=#fefefe
| – ||  || MBA-I || 20.8 || data-sort-value="0.21" | 210 m || single || 9 days || 31 Mar 2001 || 14 || align=left | Disc.: Kitt Peak Obs. || 
|- id="2001 FA222" bgcolor=#E9E9E9
| 0 ||  || MBA-M || 18.13 || 1.3 km || multiple || 2001–2021 || 08 Aug 2021 || 58 || align=left | Disc.: Kitt Peak Obs.Alt.: 2003 SV409 || 
|- id="2001 FB222" bgcolor=#E9E9E9
| – ||  || MBA-M || 18.1 || 1.3 km || single || 8 days || 30 Mar 2001 || 14 || align=left | Disc.: Kitt Peak Obs. || 
|- id="2001 FC222" bgcolor=#fefefe
| – ||  || MBA-I || 21.2 || data-sort-value="0.17" | 170 m || single || 7 days || 29 Mar 2001 || 11 || align=left | Disc.: Kitt Peak Obs. || 
|- id="2001 FD222" bgcolor=#d6d6d6
| 4 ||  || MBA-O || 17.68 || 1.6 km || multiple || 2001-2023 || 20 Jan 2023 || 30 || align=left | Disc.: Kitt Peak Obs. || 
|- id="2001 FE222" bgcolor=#fefefe
| – ||  || MBA-I || 19.6 || data-sort-value="0.36" | 360 m || single || 9 days || 31 Mar 2001 || 18 || align=left | Disc.: Kitt Peak Obs. || 
|- id="2001 FF222" bgcolor=#d6d6d6
| – ||  || MBA-O || 19.2 || data-sort-value="0.80" | 800 m || single || 9 days || 31 Mar 2001 || 18 || align=left | Disc.: Kitt Peak Obs. || 
|- id="2001 FG222" bgcolor=#d6d6d6
| 3 ||  || MBA-O || 17.52 || 1.7 km || multiple || 2001-2019 || 03 Oct 2019 || 45 || align=left | Disc.: Kitt Peak Obs.Alt.: 2014 SP410 || 
|- id="2001 FJ222" bgcolor=#d6d6d6
| – ||  || MBA-O || 20.2 || data-sort-value="0.51" | 510 m || single || 7 days || 29 Mar 2001 || 11 || align=left | Disc.: Kitt Peak Obs. || 
|- id="2001 FL222" bgcolor=#E9E9E9
| – ||  || MBA-M || 19.4 || data-sort-value="0.73" | 730 m || single || 7 days || 29 Mar 2001 || 11 || align=left | Disc.: Kitt Peak Obs. || 
|- id="2001 FM222" bgcolor=#E9E9E9
| – ||  || MBA-M || 19.4 || data-sort-value="0.55" | 550 m || single || 7 days || 29 Mar 2001 || 11 || align=left | Disc.: Kitt Peak Obs. || 
|- id="2001 FN222" bgcolor=#fefefe
| – ||  || MBA-I || 19.9 || data-sort-value="0.31" | 310 m || single || 9 days || 31 Mar 2001 || 18 || align=left | Disc.: Kitt Peak Obs. || 
|- id="2001 FO222" bgcolor=#fefefe
| 0 ||  || MBA-I || 19.14 || data-sort-value="0.44" | 440 m || multiple || 2001–2021 || 19 Nov 2021 || 88 || align=left | Disc.: Kitt Peak Obs. || 
|- id="2001 FP222" bgcolor=#E9E9E9
| – ||  || MBA-M || 18.3 || data-sort-value="0.65" | 650 m || single || 9 days || 31 Mar 2001 || 13 || align=left | Disc.: Kitt Peak Obs. || 
|- id="2001 FQ222" bgcolor=#E9E9E9
| – ||  || MBA-M || 20.3 || data-sort-value="0.37" | 370 m || single || 8 days || 30 Mar 2001 || 10 || align=left | Disc.: Kitt Peak Obs. || 
|- id="2001 FR222" bgcolor=#d6d6d6
| – ||  || MBA-O || 18.6 || 1.1 km || single || 7 days || 29 Mar 2001 || 10 || align=left | Disc.: Kitt Peak Obs. || 
|- id="2001 FS222" bgcolor=#E9E9E9
| – ||  || MBA-M || 18.4 || data-sort-value="0.88" | 880 m || single || 8 days || 30 Mar 2001 || 14 || align=left | Disc.: Kitt Peak Obs. || 
|- id="2001 FT222" bgcolor=#E9E9E9
| – ||  || MBA-M || 18.7 || data-sort-value="0.54" | 540 m || single || 9 days || 31 Mar 2001 || 14 || align=left | Disc.: Kitt Peak Obs. || 
|- id="2001 FU222" bgcolor=#d6d6d6
| – ||  || MBA-O || 17.8 || 1.5 km || single || 8 days || 30 Mar 2001 || 14 || align=left | Disc.: Kitt Peak Obs. || 
|- id="2001 FV222" bgcolor=#d6d6d6
| – ||  || MBA-O || 18.3 || 1.2 km || single || 7 days || 29 Mar 2001 || 11 || align=left | Disc.: Kitt Peak Obs. || 
|- id="2001 FW222" bgcolor=#fefefe
| – ||  || MBA-I || 20.9 || data-sort-value="0.20" | 200 m || single || 7 days || 29 Mar 2001 || 10 || align=left | Disc.: Kitt Peak Obs. || 
|- id="2001 FY222" bgcolor=#d6d6d6
| – ||  || MBA-O || 18.3 || 1.2 km || single || 8 days || 30 Mar 2001 || 14 || align=left | Disc.: Kitt Peak Obs. || 
|- id="2001 FZ222" bgcolor=#fefefe
| – ||  || MBA-I || 19.0 || data-sort-value="0.47" | 470 m || single || 8 days || 30 Mar 2001 || 14 || align=left | Disc.: Kitt Peak Obs. || 
|- id="2001 FA223" bgcolor=#E9E9E9
| – ||  || MBA-M || 18.9 || data-sort-value="0.70" | 700 m || single || 7 days || 29 Mar 2001 || 11 || align=left | Disc.: Kitt Peak Obs. || 
|- id="2001 FC223" bgcolor=#d6d6d6
| – ||  || MBA-O || 19.9 || data-sort-value="0.58" | 580 m || single || 7 days || 29 Mar 2001 || 11 || align=left | Disc.: Kitt Peak Obs. || 
|- id="2001 FD223" bgcolor=#d6d6d6
| – ||  || MBA-O || 20.1 || data-sort-value="0.53" | 530 m || single || 8 days || 30 Mar 2001 || 14 || align=left | Disc.: Kitt Peak Obs. || 
|- id="2001 FE223" bgcolor=#d6d6d6
| 0 ||  || MBA-O || 17.4 || 1.8 km || multiple || 2001–2020 || 11 Dec 2020 || 42 || align=left | Disc.: Kitt Peak Obs. || 
|- id="2001 FG223" bgcolor=#d6d6d6
| – ||  || MBA-O || 17.7 || 1.6 km || single || 8 days || 30 Mar 2001 || 10 || align=left | Disc.: Kitt Peak Obs. || 
|- id="2001 FH223" bgcolor=#d6d6d6
| – ||  || MBA-O || 18.6 || 1.1 km || single || 9 days || 31 Mar 2001 || 18 || align=left | Disc.: Kitt Peak Obs. || 
|- id="2001 FJ223" bgcolor=#fefefe
| – ||  || MBA-I || 19.5 || data-sort-value="0.37" | 370 m || single || 9 days || 31 Mar 2001 || 17 || align=left | Disc.: Kitt Peak Obs. || 
|- id="2001 FL223" bgcolor=#fefefe
| – ||  || MBA-I || 19.5 || data-sort-value="0.37" | 370 m || single || 9 days || 31 Mar 2001 || 18 || align=left | Disc.: Kitt Peak Obs. || 
|- id="2001 FM223" bgcolor=#d6d6d6
| – ||  || MBA-O || 18.1 || 1.3 km || single || 8 days || 30 Mar 2001 || 10 || align=left | Disc.: Kitt Peak Obs. || 
|- id="2001 FN223" bgcolor=#d6d6d6
| – ||  || MBA-O || 19.2 || data-sort-value="0.80" | 800 m || single || 9 days || 31 Mar 2001 || 11 || align=left | Disc.: Kitt Peak Obs. || 
|- id="2001 FO223" bgcolor=#d6d6d6
| – ||  || MBA-O || 18.7 || 1.0 km || single || 8 days || 30 Mar 2001 || 14 || align=left | Disc.: Kitt Peak Obs. || 
|- id="2001 FP223" bgcolor=#fefefe
| – ||  || MBA-I || 21.5 || data-sort-value="0.15" | 150 m || single || 7 days || 29 Mar 2001 || 10 || align=left | Disc.: Kitt Peak Obs. || 
|- id="2001 FQ223" bgcolor=#E9E9E9
| 4 ||  || MBA-M || 18.8 || data-sort-value="0.73" | 730 m || multiple || 2001–2019 || 09 Aug 2019 || 35 || align=left | Disc.: Kitt Peak Obs.Alt.: 2015 RU164 || 
|- id="2001 FR223" bgcolor=#d6d6d6
| – ||  || MBA-O || 18.0 || 1.4 km || single || 7 days || 29 Mar 2001 || 11 || align=left | Disc.: Kitt Peak Obs. || 
|- id="2001 FT223" bgcolor=#E9E9E9
| – ||  || MBA-M || 20.3 || data-sort-value="0.26" | 260 m || single || 7 days || 29 Mar 2001 || 11 || align=left | Disc.: Kitt Peak Obs. || 
|- id="2001 FU223" bgcolor=#d6d6d6
| – ||  || MBA-O || 18.4 || 1.2 km || single || 8 days || 30 Mar 2001 || 16 || align=left | Disc.: Kitt Peak Obs. || 
|- id="2001 FV223" bgcolor=#d6d6d6
| – ||  || MBA-O || 17.8 || 1.5 km || single || 8 days || 30 Mar 2001 || 14 || align=left | Disc.: Kitt Peak Obs. || 
|- id="2001 FW223" bgcolor=#d6d6d6
| – ||  || MBA-O || 18.9 || data-sort-value="0.92" | 920 m || single || 9 days || 31 Mar 2001 || 16 || align=left | Disc.: Kitt Peak Obs. || 
|- id="2001 FX223" bgcolor=#E9E9E9
| – ||  || MBA-M || 20.4 || data-sort-value="0.25" | 250 m || single || 7 days || 29 Mar 2001 || 11 || align=left | Disc.: Kitt Peak Obs. || 
|- id="2001 FZ223" bgcolor=#E9E9E9
| – ||  || MBA-M || 18.2 || data-sort-value="0.96" | 960 m || single || 7 days || 29 Mar 2001 || 11 || align=left | Disc.: Kitt Peak Obs. || 
|- id="2001 FA224" bgcolor=#E9E9E9
| – ||  || MBA-M || 19.0 || data-sort-value="0.88" | 880 m || single || 9 days || 31 Mar 2001 || 14 || align=left | Disc.: Kitt Peak Obs. || 
|- id="2001 FB224" bgcolor=#E9E9E9
| – ||  || MBA-M || 19.2 || data-sort-value="0.43" | 430 m || single || 7 days || 29 Mar 2001 || 11 || align=left | Disc.: Kitt Peak Obs. || 
|- id="2001 FC224" bgcolor=#d6d6d6
| – ||  || MBA-O || 17.9 || 1.5 km || single || 8 days || 30 Mar 2001 || 10 || align=left | Disc.: Kitt Peak Obs. || 
|- id="2001 FD224" bgcolor=#E9E9E9
| – ||  || MBA-M || 18.8 || data-sort-value="0.97" | 970 m || single || 7 days || 29 Mar 2001 || 11 || align=left | Disc.: Kitt Peak Obs. || 
|- id="2001 FE224" bgcolor=#E9E9E9
| – ||  || MBA-M || 19.2 || data-sort-value="0.80" | 800 m || single || 9 days || 31 Mar 2001 || 17 || align=left | Disc.: Kitt Peak Obs. || 
|- id="2001 FF224" bgcolor=#E9E9E9
| 6 ||  || MBA-M || 19.4 || data-sort-value="0.64" | 730 m || multiple || 2001-2015 || 19 Apr 2015 || 18 || align=left | Disc.: Kitt Peak Obs. || 
|- id="2001 FG224" bgcolor=#d6d6d6
| 0 ||  || MBA-O || 17.87 || 1.5 km || multiple || 2001–2020 || 10 Dec 2020 || 57 || align=left | Disc.: Kitt Peak Obs. || 
|- id="2001 FJ224" bgcolor=#fefefe
| 5 ||  || MBA-I || 19.6 || data-sort-value="0.36" | 360 m || multiple || 2001–2015 || 22 Jan 2015 || 21 || align=left | Disc.: Kitt Peak Obs.Alt.: 2015 BX478 || 
|- id="2001 FK224" bgcolor=#E9E9E9
| 1 ||  || MBA-M || 18.9 || data-sort-value="0.70" | 700 m || multiple || 1998–2015 || 03 Nov 2015 || 29 || align=left | Disc.: Kitt Peak Obs. || 
|- id="2001 FM224" bgcolor=#d6d6d6
| – ||  || MBA-O || 19.0 || data-sort-value="0.88" | 880 m || single || 7 days || 29 Mar 2001 || 11 || align=left | Disc.: Kitt Peak Obs. || 
|- id="2001 FN224" bgcolor=#E9E9E9
| – ||  || MBA-M || 18.3 || 1.2 km || single || 7 days || 29 Mar 2001 || 11 || align=left | Disc.: Kitt Peak Obs. || 
|- id="2001 FO224" bgcolor=#d6d6d6
| 7 ||  || MBA-O || 18.6 || 1.1 km || single || 9 days || 31 Mar 2001 || 15 || align=left | Disc.: Kitt Peak Obs. || 
|- id="2001 FP224" bgcolor=#fefefe
| 6 ||  || MBA-I || 20.4 || data-sort-value="0.25" | 250 m || multiple || 2001–2014 || 24 Apr 2014 || 25 || align=left | Disc.: Kitt Peak Obs. || 
|- id="2001 FQ224" bgcolor=#fefefe
| 0 ||  || MBA-I || 18.9 || data-sort-value="0.49" | 490 m || multiple || 2001–2019 || 26 Nov 2019 || 66 || align=left | Disc.: Kitt Peak Obs.Alt.: 2015 KN53 || 
|- id="2001 FR224" bgcolor=#fefefe
| 1 ||  || MBA-I || 19.0 || data-sort-value="0.47" | 470 m || multiple || 2001–2020 || 09 Sep 2020 || 39 || align=left | Disc.: Kitt Peak Obs.Alt.: 2020 QA77 || 
|- id="2001 FS224" bgcolor=#E9E9E9
| 1 ||  || MBA-M || 18.64 || 560 m || multiple || 2001-2921 || 04 Sep 2021 || 40 || align=left | Disc.: Kitt Peak Obs.Alt.: 2015 HB240 || 
|- id="2001 FT224" bgcolor=#fefefe
| – ||  || MBA-I || 20.5 || data-sort-value="0.24" | 240 m || single || 7 days || 29 Mar 2001 || 11 || align=left | Disc.: Kitt Peak Obs. || 
|- id="2001 FV224" bgcolor=#E9E9E9
| – ||  || MBA-M || 18.6 || data-sort-value="0.57" | 570 m || single || 8 days || 30 Mar 2001 || 14 || align=left | Disc.: Kitt Peak Obs. || 
|- id="2001 FX224" bgcolor=#E9E9E9
| – ||  || MBA-M || 20.0 || data-sort-value="0.30" | 300 m || single || 9 days || 31 Mar 2001 || 18 || align=left | Disc.: Kitt Peak Obs. || 
|- id="2001 FY224" bgcolor=#d6d6d6
| 0 ||  || MBA-O || 17.03 || 2.2 km || multiple || 2001–2021 || 28 Nov 2021 || 90 || align=left | Disc.: Kitt Peak Obs. || 
|- id="2001 FZ224" bgcolor=#E9E9E9
| – ||  || MBA-M || 19.9 || data-sort-value="0.44" | 440 m || single || 7 days || 29 Mar 2001 || 11 || align=left | Disc.: Kitt Peak Obs. || 
|- id="2001 FA225" bgcolor=#d6d6d6
| – ||  || MBA-O || 19.6 || data-sort-value="0.67" | 670 m || single || 7 days || 29 Mar 2001 || 11 || align=left | Disc.: Kitt Peak Obs. || 
|- id="2001 FB225" bgcolor=#E9E9E9
| – ||  || MBA-M || 19.7 || data-sort-value="0.34" | 340 m || single || 8 days || 30 Mar 2001 || 14 || align=left | Disc.: Kitt Peak Obs. || 
|- id="2001 FC225" bgcolor=#fefefe
| – ||  || MBA-I || 20.2 || data-sort-value="0.27" | 270 m || single || 9 days || 31 Mar 2001 || 18 || align=left | Disc.: Kitt Peak Obs. || 
|- id="2001 FD225" bgcolor=#d6d6d6
| 0 ||  || MBA-O || 17.3 || 1.9 km || multiple || 2001–2019 || 03 Oct 2019 || 56 || align=left | Disc.: Kitt Peak Obs. || 
|- id="2001 FE225" bgcolor=#E9E9E9
| – ||  || MBA-M || 18.2 || 1.3 km || single || 7 days || 29 Mar 2001 || 11 || align=left | Disc.: Kitt Peak Obs. || 
|- id="2001 FF225" bgcolor=#d6d6d6
| – ||  || MBA-O || 18.4 || 1.2 km || single || 9 days || 31 Mar 2001 || 14 || align=left | Disc.: Kitt Peak Obs. || 
|- id="2001 FG225" bgcolor=#E9E9E9
| 5 ||  || MBA-M || 19.6 || data-sort-value="0.51" | 510 m || multiple || 2001–2014 || 24 Apr 2014 || 22 || align=left | Disc.: Kitt Peak Obs. || 
|- id="2001 FH225" bgcolor=#d6d6d6
| 0 ||  || MBA-O || 17.39 || 1.9 km || multiple || 2001-2022 || 06 Mar 2022 || 107 || align=left | Disc.: Kitt Peak Obs.Alt.: 2015 XM449 || 
|- id="2001 FL225" bgcolor=#d6d6d6
| – ||  || MBA-O || 18.3 || 1.2 km || single || 9 days || 31 Mar 2001 || 14 || align=left | Disc.: Kitt Peak Obs. || 
|- id="2001 FM225" bgcolor=#E9E9E9
| – ||  || MBA-M || 19.8 || data-sort-value="0.61" | 610 m || single || 8 days || 30 Mar 2001 || 10 || align=left | Disc.: Kitt Peak Obs. || 
|- id="2001 FN225" bgcolor=#E9E9E9
| – ||  || MBA-M || 19.9 || data-sort-value="0.58" | 580 m || single || 7 days || 29 Mar 2001 || 11 || align=left | Disc.: Kitt Peak Obs. || 
|- id="2001 FO225" bgcolor=#d6d6d6
| – ||  || MBA-O || 19.4 || data-sort-value="0.73" | 730 m || single || 9 days || 31 Mar 2001 || 14 || align=left | Disc.: Kitt Peak Obs. || 
|- id="2001 FR225" bgcolor=#fefefe
| 0 ||  || MBA-I || 18.3 || data-sort-value="0.65" | 650 m || multiple || 2001–2021 || 08 Jan 2021 || 71 || align=left | Disc.: Kitt Peak Obs.Alt.: 2020 XF13 || 
|- id="2001 FS225" bgcolor=#fefefe
| – ||  || MBA-I || 21.6 || data-sort-value="0.14" | 140 m || single || 7 days || 29 Mar 2001 || 4 || align=left | Disc.: Kitt Peak Obs. || 
|- id="2001 FT225" bgcolor=#d6d6d6
| – ||  || MBA-O || 17.9 || 1.5 km || single || 8 days || 30 Mar 2001 || 13 || align=left | Disc.: Kitt Peak Obs. || 
|- id="2001 FU225" bgcolor=#E9E9E9
| – ||  || MBA-M || 18.7 || data-sort-value="0.76" | 760 m || single || 9 days || 31 Mar 2001 || 18 || align=left | Disc.: Kitt Peak Obs. || 
|- id="2001 FV225" bgcolor=#E9E9E9
| – ||  || MBA-M || 18.7 || data-sort-value="0.54" | 540 m || single || 9 days || 31 Mar 2001 || 11 || align=left | Disc.: Kitt Peak Obs. || 
|- id="2001 FW225" bgcolor=#d6d6d6
| – ||  || MBA-O || 19.4 || data-sort-value="0.73" | 730 m || single || 7 days || 29 Mar 2001 || 11 || align=left | Disc.: Kitt Peak Obs. || 
|- id="2001 FX225" bgcolor=#d6d6d6
| – ||  || MBA-O || 20.3 || data-sort-value="0.48" | 480 m || single || 7 days || 29 Mar 2001 || 11 || align=left | Disc.: Kitt Peak Obs. || 
|- id="2001 FY225" bgcolor=#E9E9E9
| 0 ||  || MBA-M || 18.47 || data-sort-value="0.85" | 850 m || multiple || 2001–2022 || 25 Jan 2022 || 106 || align=left | Disc.: Kitt Peak Obs.Alt.: 2008 YM100 || 
|- id="2001 FZ225" bgcolor=#d6d6d6
| – ||  || MBA-O || 18.1 || 1.3 km || single || 7 days || 29 Mar 2001 || 10 || align=left | Disc.: Kitt Peak Obs. || 
|- id="2001 FA226" bgcolor=#d6d6d6
| – ||  || MBA-O || 17.6 || 1.7 km || single || 9 days || 31 Mar 2001 || 20 || align=left | Disc.: Kitt Peak Obs. || 
|- id="2001 FB226" bgcolor=#E9E9E9
| 4 ||  || MBA-M || 18.9 || data-sort-value="0.70" | 700 m || multiple || 2001–2018 || 18 Mar 2018 || 31 || align=left | Disc.: Kitt Peak Obs.Alt.: 2014 HV78 || 
|- id="2001 FC226" bgcolor=#d6d6d6
| – ||  || MBA-O || 18.8 || data-sort-value="0.97" | 970 m || single || 9 days || 31 Mar 2001 || 10 || align=left | Disc.: Kitt Peak Obs. || 
|- id="2001 FD226" bgcolor=#E9E9E9
| – ||  || MBA-M || 18.6 || 1.1 km || single || 9 days || 31 Mar 2001 || 18 || align=left | Disc.: Kitt Peak Obs. || 
|- id="2001 FE226" bgcolor=#d6d6d6
| – ||  || MBA-O || 18.4 || 1.2 km || single || 9 days || 31 Mar 2001 || 16 || align=left | Disc.: Kitt Peak Obs. || 
|- id="2001 FF226" bgcolor=#fefefe
| – ||  || MBA-I || 20.7 || data-sort-value="0.22" | 220 m || single || 9 days || 31 Mar 2001 || 15 || align=left | Disc.: Kitt Peak Obs. || 
|- id="2001 FG226" bgcolor=#E9E9E9
| – ||  || MBA-M || 20.5 || data-sort-value="0.44" | 440 m || single || 9 days || 31 Mar 2001 || 10 || align=left | Disc.: Kitt Peak Obs. || 
|- id="2001 FJ226" bgcolor=#E9E9E9
| – ||  || MBA-M || 19.5 || data-sort-value="0.70" | 700 m || single || 9 days || 31 Mar 2001 || 14 || align=left | Disc.: Kitt Peak Obs. || 
|- id="2001 FK226" bgcolor=#d6d6d6
| – ||  || MBA-O || 18.1 || 1.3 km || single || 7 days || 29 Mar 2001 || 11 || align=left | Disc.: Kitt Peak Obs. || 
|- id="2001 FN226" bgcolor=#E9E9E9
| – ||  || MBA-M || 18.6 || data-sort-value="0.80" | 800 m || single || 9 days || 31 Mar 2001 || 20 || align=left | Disc.: Kitt Peak Obs. || 
|- id="2001 FO226" bgcolor=#fefefe
| – ||  || MBA-I || 19.3 || data-sort-value="0.41" | 410 m || single || 8 days || 30 Mar 2001 || 16 || align=left | Disc.: Kitt Peak Obs. || 
|- id="2001 FQ226" bgcolor=#d6d6d6
| 1 ||  || MBA-O || 17.15 || 2.1 km || multiple || 2001-2020 || 12 Sep 2020 || 38 || align=left | Disc.: Kitt Peak Obs. || 
|- id="2001 FT226" bgcolor=#E9E9E9
| – ||  || MBA-M || 18.8 || data-sort-value="0.73" | 730 m || single || 9 days || 31 Mar 2001 || 14 || align=left | Disc.: Kitt Peak Obs. || 
|- id="2001 FV226" bgcolor=#E9E9E9
| – ||  || MBA-M || 18.1 || 1.3 km || single || 9 days || 31 Mar 2001 || 13 || align=left | Disc.: Kitt Peak Obs. || 
|- id="2001 FW226" bgcolor=#E9E9E9
| – ||  || MBA-M || 18.4 || data-sort-value="0.62" | 620 m || single || 8 days || 30 Mar 2001 || 10 || align=left | Disc.: Kitt Peak Obs. || 
|- id="2001 FX226" bgcolor=#d6d6d6
| 0 ||  || MBA-O || 17.1 || 2.1 km || multiple || 2001–2020 || 22 Sep 2020 || 33 || align=left | Disc.: Kitt Peak Obs. || 
|- id="2001 FY226" bgcolor=#d6d6d6
| 0 ||  || MBA-O || 17.88 || 1.5 km || multiple || 2001–2021 || 10 Apr 2021 || 38 || align=left | Disc.: Kitt Peak Obs. || 
|- id="2001 FZ226" bgcolor=#E9E9E9
| – ||  || MBA-M || 18.6 || data-sort-value="0.80" | 800 m || single || 9 days || 31 Mar 2001 || 15 || align=left | Disc.: Kitt Peak Obs. || 
|- id="2001 FA227" bgcolor=#E9E9E9
| – ||  || MBA-M || 19.7 || data-sort-value="0.64" | 640 m || single || 9 days || 31 Mar 2001 || 10 || align=left | Disc.: Kitt Peak Obs. || 
|- id="2001 FB227" bgcolor=#E9E9E9
| – ||  || MBA-M || 18.5 || 1.1 km || single || 9 days || 31 Mar 2001 || 17 || align=left | Disc.: Kitt Peak Obs. || 
|- id="2001 FC227" bgcolor=#fefefe
| – ||  || MBA-I || 19.6 || data-sort-value="0.36" | 360 m || single || 9 days || 31 Mar 2001 || 18 || align=left | Disc.: Kitt Peak Obs. || 
|- id="2001 FD227" bgcolor=#fefefe
| 0 ||  || MBA-I || 19.17 || data-sort-value="0.44" | 440 m || multiple || 2001–2021 || 08 Sep 2021 || 86 || align=left | Disc.: Kitt Peak Obs.Alt.: 2015 XU202 || 
|- id="2001 FE227" bgcolor=#d6d6d6
| – ||  || MBA-O || 18.3 || 1.2 km || single || 9 days || 31 Mar 2001 || 13 || align=left | Disc.: Kitt Peak Obs. || 
|- id="2001 FF227" bgcolor=#E9E9E9
| 1 ||  || MBA-M || 18.3 || data-sort-value="0.65" | 650 m || multiple || 2001–2018 || 12 Jul 2018 || 39 || align=left | Disc.: Kitt Peak Obs. || 
|- id="2001 FG227" bgcolor=#d6d6d6
| – ||  || MBA-O || 18.9 || data-sort-value="0.92" | 920 m || single || 8 days || 30 Mar 2001 || 16 || align=left | Disc.: Kitt Peak Obs. || 
|- id="2001 FH227" bgcolor=#fefefe
| – ||  || MBA-I || 19.6 || data-sort-value="0.36" | 360 m || single || 8 days || 30 Mar 2001 || 10 || align=left | Disc.: Kitt Peak Obs. || 
|- id="2001 FJ227" bgcolor=#fefefe
| – ||  || MBA-I || 20.7 || data-sort-value="0.22" | 220 m || single || 9 days || 31 Mar 2001 || 17 || align=left | Disc.: Kitt Peak Obs. || 
|- id="2001 FK227" bgcolor=#E9E9E9
| – ||  || MBA-M || 18.8 || data-sort-value="0.52" | 520 m || single || 9 days || 31 Mar 2001 || 14 || align=left | Disc.: Kitt Peak Obs. || 
|- id="2001 FL227" bgcolor=#FA8072
| 0 ||  || MCA || 20.2 || data-sort-value="0.27" | 270 m || multiple || 2001–2020 || 17 Oct 2020 || 56 || align=left | Disc.: Kitt Peak Obs.Alt.: 2011 BA146 || 
|- id="2001 FM227" bgcolor=#E9E9E9
| 1 ||  || MBA-M || 20.10 || data-sort-value="0.28" | 280 m || multiple || 2001–2020 || 23 Oct 2020 || 35 || align=left | Disc.: Kitt Peak Obs.Alt.: 2013 AO143 || 
|- id="2001 FN227" bgcolor=#d6d6d6
| – ||  || MBA-O || 18.1 || 1.3 km || single || 9 days || 31 Mar 2001 || 17 || align=left | Disc.: Kitt Peak Obs. || 
|- id="2001 FQ227" bgcolor=#fefefe
| – ||  || MBA-I || 19.7 || data-sort-value="0.34" | 340 m || single || 9 days || 31 Mar 2001 || 17 || align=left | Disc.: Kitt Peak Obs. || 
|- id="2001 FR227" bgcolor=#E9E9E9
| 0 ||  || MBA-M || 18.0 || 1.1 km || multiple || 2001–2020 || 10 Dec 2020 || 96 || align=left | Disc.: Kitt Peak Obs.Alt.: 2011 SV77 || 
|- id="2001 FS227" bgcolor=#d6d6d6
| – ||  || MBA-O || 17.4 || 1.8 km || single || 7 days || 29 Mar 2001 || 11 || align=left | Disc.: Kitt Peak Obs. || 
|- id="2001 FT227" bgcolor=#fefefe
| 1 ||  || MBA-I || 19.1 || data-sort-value="0.45" | 450 m || multiple || 2001–2018 || 15 Jun 2018 || 38 || align=left | Disc.: Kitt Peak Obs. || 
|- id="2001 FW227" bgcolor=#fefefe
| – ||  || MBA-I || 20.6 || data-sort-value="0.23" | 230 m || single || 9 days || 31 Mar 2001 || 14 || align=left | Disc.: Kitt Peak Obs. || 
|- id="2001 FX227" bgcolor=#E9E9E9
| 6 ||  || MBA-M || 18.84 || data-sort-value="0.70" | 700 m || multiple || 2001-2016 || 29 Oct 2016 || 66 || align=left | Disc.: Kitt Peak Obs. Alt.: 2016 UL218 || 
|- id="2001 FY227" bgcolor=#E9E9E9
| 0 ||  || MBA-M || 17.8 || 1.2 km || multiple || 2001–2020 || 14 Sep 2020 || 67 || align=left | Disc.: Kitt Peak Obs. || 
|- id="2001 FZ227" bgcolor=#d6d6d6
| 0 ||  || MBA-O || 17.58 || 1.7 km || multiple || 2001–2022 || 08 Jan 2022 || 43 || align=left | Disc.: Kitt Peak Obs. || 
|- id="2001 FA228" bgcolor=#d6d6d6
| – ||  || MBA-O || 18.2 || 1.3 km || single || 8 days || 31 Mar 2001 || 14 || align=left | Disc.: Kitt Peak Obs. || 
|- id="2001 FB228" bgcolor=#fefefe
| 0 ||  || MBA-I || 18.4 || data-sort-value="0.62" | 620 m || multiple || 1999–2021 || 12 Jan 2021 || 62 || align=left | Disc.: Kitt Peak Obs. || 
|- id="2001 FC228" bgcolor=#d6d6d6
| – ||  || MBA-O || 18.8 || data-sort-value="0.97" | 970 m || single || 8 days || 31 Mar 2001 || 10 || align=left | Disc.: Kitt Peak Obs. || 
|- id="2001 FD228" bgcolor=#d6d6d6
| – ||  || MBA-O || 17.5 || 1.8 km || single || 7 days || 30 Mar 2001 || 12 || align=left | Disc.: Kitt Peak Obs. || 
|- id="2001 FE228" bgcolor=#fefefe
| – ||  || MBA-I || 19.5 || data-sort-value="0.37" | 370 m || single || 8 days || 31 Mar 2001 || 12 || align=left | Disc.: Kitt Peak Obs. || 
|- id="2001 FF228" bgcolor=#d6d6d6
| – ||  || MBA-O || 17.8 || 1.5 km || single || 8 days || 31 Mar 2001 || 14 || align=left | Disc.: Kitt Peak Obs. || 
|- id="2001 FH228" bgcolor=#d6d6d6
| 0 ||  || MBA-O || 17.46 || 1.8 km || multiple || 2001–2021 || 06 Oct 2021 || 55 || align=left | Disc.: Kitt Peak Obs. || 
|- id="2001 FJ228" bgcolor=#C2FFFF
| – ||  || JT || 15.9 || 3.7 km || single || 7 days || 30 Mar 2001 || 10 || align=left | Disc.: Kitt Peak Obs.Greek camp (L4) || 
|- id="2001 FL228" bgcolor=#E9E9E9
| – ||  || MBA-M || 19.5 || data-sort-value="0.37" | 370 m || single || 8 days || 31 Mar 2001 || 14 || align=left | Disc.: Kitt Peak Obs. || 
|- id="2001 FM228" bgcolor=#fefefe
| – ||  || MBA-I || 20.3 || data-sort-value="0.26" | 260 m || single || 8 days || 31 Mar 2001 || 10 || align=left | Disc.: Kitt Peak Obs. || 
|- id="2001 FN228" bgcolor=#d6d6d6
| – ||  || MBA-O || 19.0 || data-sort-value="0.88" | 880 m || single || 7 days || 30 Mar 2001 || 10 || align=left | Disc.: Kitt Peak Obs. || 
|- id="2001 FP228" bgcolor=#fefefe
| – ||  || MBA-I || 20.3 || data-sort-value="0.26" | 260 m || single || 8 days || 31 Mar 2001 || 11 || align=left | Disc.: Kitt Peak Obs. || 
|- id="2001 FQ228" bgcolor=#d6d6d6
| – ||  || MBA-O || 17.9 || 1.5 km || single || 8 days || 31 Mar 2001 || 12 || align=left | Disc.: Kitt Peak Obs. || 
|- id="2001 FS228" bgcolor=#fefefe
| 0 ||  || MBA-I || 18.6 || data-sort-value="0.57" | 570 m || multiple || 2001–2019 || 22 Aug 2019 || 48 || align=left | Disc.: Kitt Peak Obs. || 
|- id="2001 FT228" bgcolor=#d6d6d6
| – ||  || MBA-O || 18.6 || 1.1 km || single || 7 days || 30 Mar 2001 || 10 || align=left | Disc.: Kitt Peak Obs. || 
|- id="2001 FU228" bgcolor=#d6d6d6
| – ||  || MBA-O || 18.1 || 1.3 km || single || 8 days || 31 Mar 2001 || 11 || align=left | Disc.: Kitt Peak Obs. || 
|- id="2001 FV228" bgcolor=#d6d6d6
| – ||  || MBA-O || 17.6 || 1.7 km || single || 7 days || 30 Mar 2001 || 10 || align=left | Disc.: Kitt Peak Obs. || 
|- id="2001 FW228" bgcolor=#fefefe
| – ||  || MBA-I || 19.6 || data-sort-value="0.36" | 360 m || single || 8 days || 31 Mar 2001 || 14 || align=left | Disc.: Kitt Peak Obs. || 
|- id="2001 FY228" bgcolor=#d6d6d6
| – ||  || MBA-O || 18.7 || 1.0 km || single || 8 days || 31 Mar 2001 || 11 || align=left | Disc.: Kitt Peak Obs. || 
|- id="2001 FZ228" bgcolor=#fefefe
| 0 ||  || MBA-I || 18.6 || data-sort-value="0.57" | 570 m || multiple || 2001–2020 || 05 Nov 2020 || 65 || align=left | Disc.: Kitt Peak Obs. || 
|- id="2001 FA229" bgcolor=#E9E9E9
| – ||  || MBA-M || 18.0 || 1.4 km || single || 8 days || 31 Mar 2001 || 11 || align=left | Disc.: Kitt Peak Obs. || 
|- id="2001 FB229" bgcolor=#E9E9E9
| 1 ||  || MBA-M || 18.5 || data-sort-value="0.59" | 590 m || multiple || 2001–2019 || 02 Nov 2019 || 34 || align=left | Disc.: Kitt Peak Obs. || 
|- id="2001 FC229" bgcolor=#d6d6d6
| – ||  || MBA-O || 19.8 || data-sort-value="0.61" | 610 m || single || 7 days || 30 Mar 2001 || 13 || align=left | Disc.: Kitt Peak Obs. || 
|- id="2001 FD229" bgcolor=#fefefe
| – ||  || MBA-I || 20.4 || data-sort-value="0.25" | 250 m || single || 7 days || 30 Mar 2001 || 11 || align=left | Disc.: Kitt Peak Obs. || 
|- id="2001 FE229" bgcolor=#fefefe
| 1 ||  || MBA-I || 19.1 || data-sort-value="0.45" | 450 m || multiple || 2001–2019 || 21 Aug 2019 || 40 || align=left | Disc.: Kitt Peak Obs. || 
|- id="2001 FF229" bgcolor=#d6d6d6
| 0 ||  || MBA-O || 17.5 || 1.8 km || multiple || 2001–2019 || 19 Nov 2019 || 46 || align=left | Disc.: Kitt Peak Obs. || 
|- id="2001 FG229" bgcolor=#d6d6d6
| – ||  || MBA-O || 19.5 || data-sort-value="0.70" | 700 m || single || 7 days || 30 Mar 2001 || 11 || align=left | Disc.: Kitt Peak Obs. || 
|- id="2001 FH229" bgcolor=#d6d6d6
| – ||  || MBA-O || 18.1 || 1.3 km || single || 8 days || 31 Mar 2001 || 11 || align=left | Disc.: Kitt Peak Obs. || 
|- id="2001 FJ229" bgcolor=#E9E9E9
| 1 ||  || MBA-M || 18.1 || data-sort-value="0.71" | 710 m || multiple || 2001–2019 || 19 Nov 2019 || 39 || align=left | Disc.: Kitt Peak Obs. || 
|- id="2001 FL229" bgcolor=#d6d6d6
| 0 ||  || MBA-O || 17.58 || 1.7 km || multiple || 2001-2022 || 07 Apr 2022 || 60 || align=left | Disc.: Kitt Peak Obs.Alt.: 2019 UD127 || 
|- id="2001 FM229" bgcolor=#E9E9E9
| – ||  || MBA-M || 18.3 || data-sort-value="0.65" | 650 m || single || 7 days || 30 Mar 2001 || 10 || align=left | Disc.: Kitt Peak Obs. || 
|- id="2001 FN229" bgcolor=#d6d6d6
| – ||  || MBA-O || 18.5 || 1.1 km || single || 8 days || 31 Mar 2001 || 12 || align=left | Disc.: Kitt Peak Obs. || 
|- id="2001 FO229" bgcolor=#E9E9E9
| – ||  || MBA-M || 19.0 || data-sort-value="0.67" | 670 m || single || 8 days || 31 Mar 2001 || 12 || align=left | Disc.: Kitt Peak Obs. || 
|- id="2001 FP229" bgcolor=#E9E9E9
| – ||  || MBA-M || 19.6 || data-sort-value="0.36" | 360 m || single || 8 days || 31 Mar 2001 || 14 || align=left | Disc.: Kitt Peak Obs. || 
|- id="2001 FQ229" bgcolor=#d6d6d6
| – ||  || MBA-O || 18.5 || 1.1 km || single || 8 days || 31 Mar 2001 || 14 || align=left | Disc.: Kitt Peak Obs. || 
|- id="2001 FR229" bgcolor=#d6d6d6
| – ||  || MBA-O || 19.1 || data-sort-value="0.84" | 840 m || single || 7 days || 30 Mar 2001 || 10 || align=left | Disc.: Kitt Peak Obs. || 
|- id="2001 FS229" bgcolor=#d6d6d6
| – ||  || MBA-O || 18.7 || 1.0 km || single || 7 days || 30 Mar 2001 || 10 || align=left | Disc.: Kitt Peak Obs. || 
|- id="2001 FT229" bgcolor=#fefefe
| – ||  || MBA-I || 20.1 || data-sort-value="0.28" | 280 m || single || 8 days || 31 Mar 2001 || 11 || align=left | Disc.: Kitt Peak Obs. || 
|- id="2001 FV229" bgcolor=#fefefe
| – ||  || MBA-I || 19.7 || data-sort-value="0.34" | 340 m || single || 8 days || 31 Mar 2001 || 14 || align=left | Disc.: Kitt Peak Obs. || 
|- id="2001 FW229" bgcolor=#d6d6d6
| – ||  || MBA-O || 17.6 || 1.7 km || single || 8 days || 31 Mar 2001 || 14 || align=left | Disc.: Kitt Peak Obs. || 
|- id="2001 FX229" bgcolor=#E9E9E9
| – ||  || MBA-M || 18.0 || 1.1 km || single || 2 days || 31 Mar 2001 || 10 || align=left | Disc.: Kitt Peak Obs. || 
|- id="2001 FY229" bgcolor=#d6d6d6
| – ||  || MBA-O || 18.3 || 1.2 km || single || 2 days || 31 Mar 2001 || 10 || align=left | Disc.: Kitt Peak Obs. || 
|- id="2001 FZ229" bgcolor=#E9E9E9
| – ||  || MBA-M || 18.4 || 1.2 km || single || 2 days || 31 Mar 2001 || 10 || align=left | Disc.: Kitt Peak Obs. || 
|- id="2001 FA230" bgcolor=#E9E9E9
| 0 ||  || MBA-M || 17.9 || 1.1 km || multiple || 2001–2019 || 29 Sep 2019 || 61 || align=left | Disc.: Kitt Peak Obs.Alt.: 2015 TV213 || 
|- id="2001 FB230" bgcolor=#E9E9E9
| – ||  || MBA-M || 18.8 || data-sort-value="0.97" | 970 m || single || 5 days || 31 Mar 2001 || 12 || align=left | Disc.: Kitt Peak Obs. || 
|- id="2001 FC230" bgcolor=#E9E9E9
| 2 ||  || MBA-M || 18.1 || 1.3 km || multiple || 2001–2017 || 25 Oct 2017 || 34 || align=left | Disc.: Kitt Peak Obs. || 
|- id="2001 FD230" bgcolor=#d6d6d6
| 0 ||  || MBA-O || 16.60 || 2.7 km || multiple || 2001–2021 || 03 May 2021 || 173 || align=left | Disc.: Spacewatch || 
|- id="2001 FG230" bgcolor=#E9E9E9
| – ||  || MBA-M || 18.6 || data-sort-value="0.80" | 800 m || single || 5 days || 31 Mar 2001 || 12 || align=left | Disc.: Kitt Peak Obs. || 
|- id="2001 FH230" bgcolor=#d6d6d6
| – ||  || MBA-O || 18.7 || 1.0 km || single || 2 days || 31 Mar 2001 || 10 || align=left | Disc.: Kitt Peak Obs. || 
|- id="2001 FJ230" bgcolor=#fefefe
| 0 ||  || MBA-I || 18.64 || data-sort-value="0.56" | 560 m || multiple || 2001–2021 || 05 Oct 2021 || 112 || align=left | Disc.: Kitt Peak Obs.Alt.: 2002 UD42 || 
|- id="2001 FK230" bgcolor=#d6d6d6
| – ||  || MBA-O || 18.4 || 1.2 km || single || 2 days || 31 Mar 2001 || 10 || align=left | Disc.: Kitt Peak Obs. || 
|- id="2001 FL230" bgcolor=#E9E9E9
| 0 ||  || MBA-M || 17.7 || data-sort-value="0.86" | 860 m || multiple || 2001–2021 || 17 Jan 2021 || 67 || align=left | Disc.: Kitt Peak Obs.Alt.: 2011 SZ44, 2015 PD218 || 
|- id="2001 FM230" bgcolor=#d6d6d6
| – ||  || MBA-O || 17.9 || 1.5 km || single || 10 days || 31 Mar 2001 || 13 || align=left | Disc.: Kitt Peak Obs. || 
|- id="2001 FO230" bgcolor=#E9E9E9
| – ||  || MBA-M || 18.9 || data-sort-value="0.92" | 920 m || single || 2 days || 31 Mar 2001 || 10 || align=left | Disc.: Kitt Peak Obs. || 
|- id="2001 FQ230" bgcolor=#fefefe
| – ||  || MBA-I || 20.1 || data-sort-value="0.28" | 280 m || single || 9 days || 31 Mar 2001 || 13 || align=left | Disc.: Kitt Peak Obs. || 
|- id="2001 FR230" bgcolor=#fefefe
| 0 ||  || MBA-I || 18.75 || data-sort-value="0.53" | 530 m || multiple || 2001–2021 || 30 Nov 2021 || 97 || align=left | Disc.: Kitt Peak Obs.Alt.: 2010 RZ145 || 
|- id="2001 FT230" bgcolor=#d6d6d6
| – ||  || MBA-O || 17.4 || 1.8 km || single || 2 days || 31 Mar 2001 || 10 || align=left | Disc.: Kitt Peak Obs. || 
|- id="2001 FU230" bgcolor=#E9E9E9
| – ||  || MBA-M || 18.3 || data-sort-value="0.65" | 650 m || single || 2 days || 31 Mar 2001 || 11 || align=left | Disc.: Kitt Peak Obs. || 
|- id="2001 FV230" bgcolor=#d6d6d6
| – ||  || MBA-O || 18.9 || data-sort-value="0.92" | 920 m || single || 2 days || 31 Mar 2001 || 11 || align=left | Disc.: Kitt Peak Obs. || 
|- id="2001 FW230" bgcolor=#d6d6d6
| – ||  || MBA-O || 17.8 || 1.5 km || single || 2 days || 31 Mar 2001 || 11 || align=left | Disc.: Kitt Peak Obs. || 
|- id="2001 FY230" bgcolor=#d6d6d6
| 0 ||  || MBA-O || 17.26 || 2.0 km || multiple || 2001–2021 || 14 Apr 2021 || 106 || align=left | Disc.: Kitt Peak Obs. || 
|- id="2001 FZ230" bgcolor=#d6d6d6
| – ||  || MBA-O || 17.8 || 1.5 km || single || 2 days || 31 Mar 2001 || 11 || align=left | Disc.: Kitt Peak Obs. || 
|- id="2001 FA231" bgcolor=#d6d6d6
| 3 ||  || MBA-O || 18.20 || 1.3 km || multiple || 2001–2021 || 30 Jun 2021 || 25 || align=left | Disc.: Kitt Peak Obs. || 
|- id="2001 FB231" bgcolor=#fefefe
| 1 ||  || MBA-I || 18.6 || data-sort-value="0.57" | 570 m || multiple || 1995–2020 || 28 Jan 2020 || 64 || align=left | Disc.: Kitt Peak Obs. || 
|- id="2001 FC231" bgcolor=#d6d6d6
| – ||  || MBA-O || 19.2 || data-sort-value="0.80" | 800 m || single || 2 days || 31 Mar 2001 || 11 || align=left | Disc.: Kitt Peak Obs. || 
|- id="2001 FD231" bgcolor=#fefefe
| 0 ||  || MBA-I || 18.7 || data-sort-value="0.54" | 540 m || multiple || 2001–2020 || 23 Oct 2020 || 51 || align=left | Disc.: Kitt Peak Obs.Alt.: 2008 FT77 || 
|- id="2001 FE231" bgcolor=#d6d6d6
| 0 ||  || MBA-O || 17.3 || 1.9 km || multiple || 2001–2021 || 16 Jan 2021 || 80 || align=left | Disc.: Kitt Peak Obs.Alt.: 2006 JE65, 2014 WF130 || 
|- id="2001 FF231" bgcolor=#d6d6d6
| 0 ||  || MBA-O || 16.7 || 2.5 km || multiple || 2001–2019 || 22 Sep 2019 || 82 || align=left | Disc.: Kitt Peak Obs.Alt.: 2014 QF378 || 
|- id="2001 FG231" bgcolor=#E9E9E9
| 0 ||  || MBA-M || 18.2 || data-sort-value="0.96" | 960 m || multiple || 2001–2020 || 21 Oct 2020 || 158 || align=left | Disc.: Kitt Peak Obs.Alt.: 2016 UM222 || 
|- id="2001 FH231" bgcolor=#d6d6d6
| – ||  || MBA-O || 18.2 || 1.3 km || single || 2 days || 31 Mar 2001 || 11 || align=left | Disc.: Kitt Peak Obs. || 
|- id="2001 FJ231" bgcolor=#E9E9E9
| – ||  || MBA-M || 18.6 || 1.1 km || single || 2 days || 31 Mar 2001 || 11 || align=left | Disc.: Kitt Peak Obs. || 
|- id="2001 FL231" bgcolor=#E9E9E9
| – ||  || MBA-M || 19.5 || data-sort-value="0.53" | 530 m || single || 2 days || 31 Mar 2001 || 10 || align=left | Disc.: Kitt Peak Obs. || 
|- id="2001 FM231" bgcolor=#E9E9E9
| 4 ||  || MBA-M || 18.3 || 1.2 km || multiple || 2001–2012 || 21 Oct 2012 || 23 || align=left | Disc.: Kitt Peak Obs.Alt.: 2012 TP49 || 
|- id="2001 FN231" bgcolor=#d6d6d6
| – ||  || MBA-O || 18.9 || data-sort-value="0.92" | 920 m || single || 2 days || 31 Mar 2001 || 11 || align=left | Disc.: Kitt Peak Obs. || 
|- id="2001 FO231" bgcolor=#d6d6d6
| – ||  || MBA-O || 17.2 || 2.0 km || single || 2 days || 31 Mar 2001 || 10 || align=left | Disc.: Kitt Peak Obs. || 
|- id="2001 FP231" bgcolor=#E9E9E9
| – ||  || MBA-M || 18.6 || data-sort-value="0.80" | 800 m || single || 2 days || 31 Mar 2001 || 10 || align=left | Disc.: Kitt Peak Obs. || 
|- id="2001 FQ231" bgcolor=#E9E9E9
| – ||  || MBA-M || 19.4 || data-sort-value="0.55" | 550 m || single || 2 days || 31 Mar 2001 || 11 || align=left | Disc.: Kitt Peak Obs. || 
|- id="2001 FR231" bgcolor=#fefefe
| – ||  || MBA-I || 21.4 || data-sort-value="0.16" | 160 m || single || 2 days || 31 Mar 2001 || 11 || align=left | Disc.: Kitt Peak Obs. || 
|- id="2001 FT231" bgcolor=#d6d6d6
| – ||  || MBA-O || 19.0 || data-sort-value="0.88" | 880 m || single || 6 days || 31 Mar 2001 || 12 || align=left | Disc.: Kitt Peak Obs. || 
|- id="2001 FU231" bgcolor=#E9E9E9
| – ||  || MBA-M || 18.2 || data-sort-value="0.68" | 680 m || single || 2 days || 31 Mar 2001 || 10 || align=left | Disc.: Kitt Peak Obs. || 
|- id="2001 FW231" bgcolor=#E9E9E9
| – ||  || MBA-M || 17.8 || 1.2 km || single || 2 days || 31 Mar 2001 || 10 || align=left | Disc.: Kitt Peak Obs. || 
|- id="2001 FX231" bgcolor=#d6d6d6
| – ||  || MBA-O || 18.3 || 1.2 km || single || 6 days || 31 Mar 2001 || 12 || align=left | Disc.: Kitt Peak Obs. || 
|- id="2001 FB232" bgcolor=#E9E9E9
| – ||  || MBA-M || 17.6 || 1.7 km || single || 2 days || 31 Mar 2001 || 10 || align=left | Disc.: Kitt Peak Obs. || 
|- id="2001 FC232" bgcolor=#fefefe
| – ||  || MBA-I || 18.8 || data-sort-value="0.52" | 520 m || single || 2 days || 31 Mar 2001 || 10 || align=left | Disc.: Kitt Peak Obs. || 
|- id="2001 FE232" bgcolor=#fefefe
| 0 ||  || MBA-I || 18.3 || data-sort-value="0.65" | 650 m || multiple || 2001–2021 || 11 Jan 2021 || 62 || align=left | Disc.: Kitt Peak Obs. || 
|- id="2001 FF232" bgcolor=#d6d6d6
| – ||  || MBA-O || 16.7 || 2.5 km || single || 2 days || 31 Mar 2001 || 10 || align=left | Disc.: Kitt Peak Obs. || 
|- id="2001 FH232" bgcolor=#E9E9E9
| – ||  || MBA-M || 17.4 || 1.4 km || single || 2 days || 31 Mar 2001 || 10 || align=left | Disc.: Kitt Peak Obs. || 
|- id="2001 FJ232" bgcolor=#d6d6d6
| – ||  || MBA-O || 19.1 || data-sort-value="0.84" | 840 m || single || 2 days || 31 Mar 2001 || 10 || align=left | Disc.: Kitt Peak Obs. || 
|- id="2001 FL232" bgcolor=#fefefe
| 0 ||  || MBA-I || 18.66 || data-sort-value="0.55" | 550 m || multiple || 2001–2021 || 11 Nov 2021 || 40 || align=left | Disc.: Kitt Peak Obs.Added on 9 March 2021 || 
|- id="2001 FP232" bgcolor=#E9E9E9
| – ||  || MBA-M || 19.6 || data-sort-value="0.51" | 510 m || single || 10 days || 31 Mar 2001 || 12 || align=left | Disc.: Kitt Peak Obs. || 
|- id="2001 FQ232" bgcolor=#fefefe
| – ||  || MBA-I || 19.7 || data-sort-value="0.34" | 340 m || single || 5 days || 26 Mar 2001 || 9 || align=left | Disc.: Kitt Peak Obs. || 
|- id="2001 FR232" bgcolor=#fefefe
| 0 ||  || MBA-I || 19.41 || data-sort-value="0.39" | 390 m || multiple || 2001–2022 || 05 Jan 2022 || 51 || align=left | Disc.: Kitt Peak Obs.Alt.: 2015 BK333 || 
|- id="2001 FU232" bgcolor=#d6d6d6
| – ||  || MBA-O || 19.1 || data-sort-value="0.84" | 840 m || single || 5 days || 26 Mar 2001 || 9 || align=left | Disc.: Kitt Peak Obs. || 
|- id="2001 FW232" bgcolor=#fefefe
| 0 ||  || MBA-I || 18.5 || data-sort-value="0.59" | 590 m || multiple || 2001–2020 || 11 Sep 2020 || 40 || align=left | Disc.: Kitt Peak Obs.Added on 19 October 2020Alt.: 2015 BA368 || 
|- id="2001 FX232" bgcolor=#fefefe
| – ||  || MBA-I || 20.6 || data-sort-value="0.23" | 230 m || single || 5 days || 26 Mar 2001 || 9 || align=left | Disc.: Kitt Peak Obs. || 
|- id="2001 FY233" bgcolor=#fefefe
| 0 ||  || MBA-I || 18.3 || data-sort-value="0.65" | 650 m || multiple || 2001–2020 || 18 Oct 2020 || 154 || align=left | Disc.: Kitt Peak Obs.Added on 19 October 2020 || 
|- id="2001 FA234" bgcolor=#FA8072
| – ||  || MCA || 22.2 || data-sort-value="0.11" | 110 m || single || 2 days || 23 Mar 2001 || 10 || align=left | Disc.: Kitt Peak Obs. || 
|- id="2001 FC234" bgcolor=#fefefe
| – ||  || MBA-I || 18.9 || data-sort-value="0.49" | 490 m || single || 2 days || 23 Mar 2001 || 10 || align=left | Disc.: Kitt Peak Obs. || 
|- id="2001 FF234" bgcolor=#d6d6d6
| – ||  || MBA-O || 20.1 || data-sort-value="0.53" | 530 m || single || 4 days || 25 Mar 2001 || 9 || align=left | Disc.: Kitt Peak Obs. || 
|- id="2001 FG234" bgcolor=#d6d6d6
| – ||  || MBA-O || 18.9 || data-sort-value="0.92" | 920 m || single || 4 days || 25 Mar 2001 || 8 || align=left | Disc.: Kitt Peak Obs. || 
|- id="2001 FH234" bgcolor=#E9E9E9
| 0 ||  || MBA-M || 18.44 || data-sort-value="0.73" | 1 km || multiple || 2001-2022 || 26 Nov 2022 || 35 || align=left | Disc.: Kitt Peak Obs.Alt.: 2020 HK109 || 
|- id="2001 FJ234" bgcolor=#E9E9E9
| – ||  || MBA-M || 20.1 || data-sort-value="0.53" | 530 m || single || 4 days || 25 Mar 2001 || 8 || align=left | Disc.: Kitt Peak Obs. || 
|- id="2001 FK234" bgcolor=#d6d6d6
| – ||  || MBA-O || 18.3 || 1.2 km || single || 8 days || 29 Mar 2001 || 12 || align=left | Disc.: Kitt Peak Obs. || 
|- id="2001 FL234" bgcolor=#E9E9E9
| 0 ||  || MBA-M || 18.86 || data-sort-value="0.71" | 710 m || multiple || 2001–2021 || 28 Oct 2021 || 67 || align=left | Disc.: Kitt Peak Obs. || 
|- id="2001 FO234" bgcolor=#d6d6d6
| 0 ||  || MBA-O || 17.7 || 1.6 km || multiple || 2001–2020 || 13 Sep 2020 || 77 || align=left | Disc.: Kitt Peak Obs.Alt.: 2004 TH349 || 
|- id="2001 FR234" bgcolor=#fefefe
| 0 ||  || MBA-I || 18.8 || data-sort-value="0.52" | 520 m || multiple || 2001–2019 || 26 Sep 2019 || 41 || align=left | Disc.: Kitt Peak Obs.Alt.: 2019 RB24 || 
|- id="2001 FV234" bgcolor=#fefefe
| – ||  || MBA-I || 19.5 || data-sort-value="0.37" | 370 m || single || 4 days || 25 Mar 2001 || 8 || align=left | Disc.: Kitt Peak Obs. || 
|- id="2001 FY234" bgcolor=#E9E9E9
| – ||  || MBA-M || 19.6 || data-sort-value="0.67" | 670 m || single || 4 days || 25 Mar 2001 || 8 || align=left | Disc.: Kitt Peak Obs. || 
|- id="2001 FA235" bgcolor=#E9E9E9
| – ||  || MBA-M || 18.8 || data-sort-value="0.73" | 730 m || single || 4 days || 25 Mar 2001 || 8 || align=left | Disc.: Kitt Peak Obs. || 
|- id="2001 FE235" bgcolor=#E9E9E9
| – ||  || MBA-M || 21.4 || data-sort-value="0.29" | 290 m || single || 4 days || 25 Mar 2001 || 8 || align=left | Disc.: Kitt Peak Obs. || 
|- id="2001 FF235" bgcolor=#d6d6d6
| 1 ||  || MBA-O || 17.90 || 1.5 km || multiple || 2001–2021 || 01 Nov 2021 || 44 || align=left | Disc.: Kitt Peak Obs.Added on 24 December 2021 || 
|- id="2001 FG235" bgcolor=#d6d6d6
| 0 ||  || MBA-O || 17.4 || 1.8 km || multiple || 2001–2021 || 08 Jun 2021 || 54 || align=left | Disc.: Kitt Peak Obs.Alt.: 2016 HE33 || 
|- id="2001 FH235" bgcolor=#fefefe
| – ||  || MBA-I || 19.3 || data-sort-value="0.41" | 410 m || single || 4 days || 25 Mar 2001 || 8 || align=left | Disc.: Kitt Peak Obs. || 
|- id="2001 FL235" bgcolor=#E9E9E9
| 0 ||  || MBA-M || 17.78 || 1.2 km || multiple || 2001–2020 || 10 Dec 2020 || 63 || align=left | Disc.: Kitt Peak Obs.Added on 24 December 2021 || 
|- id="2001 FT235" bgcolor=#fefefe
| – ||  || MBA-I || 21.5 || data-sort-value="0.15" | 150 m || single || 4 days || 26 Mar 2001 || 9 || align=left | Disc.: Kitt Peak Obs. || 
|- id="2001 FM236" bgcolor=#E9E9E9
| – ||  || MBA-M || 18.6 || data-sort-value="0.80" | 800 m || single || 9 days || 31 Mar 2001 || 11 || align=left | Disc.: Kitt Peak Obs. || 
|- id="2001 FN236" bgcolor=#fefefe
| 3 ||  || MBA-I || 19.4 || data-sort-value="0.39" | 390 m || multiple || 2001–2017 || 22 Sep 2017 || 22 || align=left | Disc.: Kitt Peak Obs. || 
|- id="2001 FP236" bgcolor=#E9E9E9
| 0 ||  || MBA-M || 17.5 || 1.8 km || multiple || 2001–2020 || 15 Oct 2020 || 82 || align=left | Disc.: Kitt Peak Obs.Alt.: 2011 SN77 || 
|- id="2001 FB237" bgcolor=#E9E9E9
| 4 ||  || MBA-M || 18.98 || data-sort-value="0.48" | 480 m || multiple || 2001–2019 || 06 Sep 2019 || 148 || align=left | Disc.: Kitt Peak Obs.Added on 29 January 2022 || 
|- id="2001 FC237" bgcolor=#fefefe
| 1 ||  || MBA-I || 18.4 || data-sort-value="0.62" | 620 m || multiple || 2001–2020 || 08 Oct 2020 || 66 || align=left | Disc.: Kitt Peak Obs.Added on 19 October 2020 || 
|- id="2001 FE237" bgcolor=#d6d6d6
| 5 ||  || MBA-O || 18.2 || 1.3 km || multiple || 2001–2015 || 08 Nov 2015 || 18 || align=left | Disc.: Kitt Peak Obs.Added on 19 October 2020 || 
|- id="2001 FU238" bgcolor=#d6d6d6
| – ||  || MBA-O || 18.2 || 1.3 km || single || 3 days || 25 Mar 2001 || 9 || align=left | Disc.: Kitt Peak Obs. || 
|- id="2001 FW238" bgcolor=#d6d6d6
| 1 ||  || MBA-O || 17.7 || 1.6 km || multiple || 1998–2021 || 14 Jun 2021 || 51 || align=left | Disc.: Kitt Peak Obs. || 
|- id="2001 FY238" bgcolor=#d6d6d6
| 0 ||  || MBA-O || 16.9 || 2.3 km || multiple || 2001–2020 || 17 Nov 2020 || 58 || align=left | Disc.: Kitt Peak Obs. || 
|- id="2001 FJ239" bgcolor=#E9E9E9
| – ||  || MBA-M || 18.1 || 1.3 km || single || 5 days || 31 Mar 2001 || 9 || align=left | Disc.: Kitt Peak Obs. || 
|- id="2001 FK239" bgcolor=#E9E9E9
| 0 ||  || MBA-M || 18.7 || 1.0 km || multiple || 2001–2020 || 19 Aug 2020 || 31 || align=left | Disc.: Kitt Peak Obs.Alt.: 2015 KJ48 || 
|- id="2001 FL239" bgcolor=#d6d6d6
| – ||  || MBA-O || 18.8 || data-sort-value="0.97" | 970 m || single || 5 days || 31 Mar 2001 || 9 || align=left | Disc.: Kitt Peak Obs. || 
|- id="2001 FM239" bgcolor=#E9E9E9
| 0 ||  || MBA-M || 18.09 || 1.0 km || multiple || 2001–2021 || 14 Nov 2021 || 49 || align=left | Disc.: Kitt Peak Obs. || 
|- id="2001 FN239" bgcolor=#E9E9E9
| – ||  || MBA-M || 18.9 || data-sort-value="0.92" | 920 m || single || 9 days || 31 Mar 2001 || 10 || align=left | Disc.: Kitt Peak Obs. || 
|- id="2001 FP239" bgcolor=#fefefe
| – ||  || MBA-I || 20.5 || data-sort-value="0.24" | 240 m || single || 5 days || 31 Mar 2001 || 9 || align=left | Disc.: Kitt Peak Obs. || 
|- id="2001 FR239" bgcolor=#fefefe
| 3 ||  || MBA-I || 19.3 || data-sort-value="0.41" | 410 m || multiple || 2001–2017 || 13 Nov 2017 || 31 || align=left | Disc.: Kitt Peak Obs. || 
|- id="2001 FS239" bgcolor=#E9E9E9
| – ||  || MBA-M || 19.3 || data-sort-value="0.77" | 770 m || single || 5 days || 31 Mar 2001 || 9 || align=left | Disc.: Kitt Peak Obs. || 
|- id="2001 FW239" bgcolor=#d6d6d6
| 3 ||  || MBA-O || 18.26 || 1.2 km || multiple || 2001–2021 || 26 Nov 2021 || 34 || align=left | Disc.: Kitt Peak Obs.Added on 24 December 2021 || 
|- id="2001 FC240" bgcolor=#d6d6d6
| 1 ||  || MBA-O || 17.56 || 1.7 km || multiple || 2001–2022 || 25 Jan 2022 || 44 || align=left | Disc.: Kitt Peak Obs. || 
|- id="2001 FD240" bgcolor=#d6d6d6
| E ||  || MBA-O || 17.7 || 1.6 km || single || 8 days || 31 Mar 2001 || 11 || align=left | Disc.: Kitt Peak Obs. || 
|- id="2001 FJ240" bgcolor=#fefefe
| – ||  || MBA-I || 21.7 || data-sort-value="0.14" | 140 m || single || 8 days || 30 Mar 2001 || 10 || align=left | Disc.: Kitt Peak Obs. || 
|- id="2001 FK240" bgcolor=#E9E9E9
| 0 ||  || MBA-M || 18.11 || 1.3 km || multiple || 2001–2021 || 26 Oct 2021 || 78 || align=left | Disc.: Kitt Peak Obs. || 
|- id="2001 FN240" bgcolor=#fefefe
| 0 ||  || MBA-I || 19.46 || data-sort-value="0.38" | 380 m || multiple || 2001–2021 || 31 Oct 2021 || 44 || align=left | Disc.: Kitt Peak Obs.Added on 19 October 2020 || 
|- id="2001 FT240" bgcolor=#d6d6d6
| 3 ||  || MBA-O || 17.4 || 1.8 km || multiple || 2001–2019 || 25 Sep 2019 || 26 || align=left | Disc.: Kitt Peak Obs.Added on 17 January 2021 || 
|- id="2001 FV240" bgcolor=#E9E9E9
| 3 ||  || MBA-M || 18.7 || data-sort-value="0.76" | 760 m || multiple || 2001–2020 || 24 Oct 2020 || 53 || align=left | Disc.: Kitt Peak Obs.Alt.: 2001 FZ248 || 
|- id="2001 FW240" bgcolor=#d6d6d6
| 0 ||  || MBA-O || 17.12 || 2.1 km || multiple || 2001–2021 || 08 Nov 2021 || 80 || align=left | Disc.: Kitt Peak Obs.Alt.: 2013 HH40 || 
|- id="2001 FX240" bgcolor=#fefefe
| 0 ||  || MBA-I || 17.8 || data-sort-value="0.82" | 820 m || multiple || 1999–2020 || 20 Apr 2020 || 141 || align=left | Disc.: Kitt Peak Obs.Alt.: 2003 WZ32 || 
|- id="2001 FC241" bgcolor=#E9E9E9
| – ||  || MBA-M || 19.7 || data-sort-value="0.64" | 640 m || single || 7 days || 30 Mar 2001 || 11 || align=left | Disc.: Kitt Peak Obs. || 
|- id="2001 FF241" bgcolor=#fefefe
| 2 ||  || MBA-I || 19.0 || data-sort-value="0.47" | 470 m || multiple || 2001–2020 || 15 Oct 2020 || 44 || align=left | Disc.: Kitt Peak Obs. || 
|- id="2001 FL241" bgcolor=#FA8072
| – ||  || MCA || 22.4 || data-sort-value="0.098" | 98 m || single || 9 days || 30 Mar 2001 || 9 || align=left | Disc.: Kitt Peak Obs. || 
|- id="2001 FN241" bgcolor=#E9E9E9
| – ||  || MBA-M || 20.1 || data-sort-value="0.53" | 530 m || single || 10 days || 31 Mar 2001 || 10 || align=left | Disc.: Kitt Peak Obs. || 
|- id="2001 FQ241" bgcolor=#d6d6d6
| 0 ||  || MBA-O || 17.7 || 1.6 km || multiple || 2001–2019 || 26 Sep 2019 || 41 || align=left | Disc.: Kitt Peak Obs.Added on 22 July 2020 || 
|- id="2001 FA242" bgcolor=#d6d6d6
| 0 ||  || MBA-O || 17.0 || 2.2 km || multiple || 2001–2020 || 14 Sep 2020 || 50 || align=left | Disc.: Kitt Peak Obs. || 
|- id="2001 FG242" bgcolor=#E9E9E9
| – ||  || MBA-M || 20.2 || data-sort-value="0.27" | 270 m || single || 5 days || 31 Mar 2001 || 9 || align=left | Disc.: Kitt Peak Obs. || 
|- id="2001 FL242" bgcolor=#d6d6d6
| – ||  || MBA-O || 17.8 || 1.5 km || single || 9 days || 31 Mar 2001 || 10 || align=left | Disc.: Kitt Peak Obs. || 
|- id="2001 FO242" bgcolor=#E9E9E9
| 4 ||  || MBA-M || 18.8 || data-sort-value="0.52" | 520 m || multiple || 2001–2019 || 03 Oct 2019 || 30 || align=left | Disc.: Kitt Peak Obs.Alt.: 2011 UM229 || 
|- id="2001 FA243" bgcolor=#E9E9E9
| 0 ||  || MBA-M || 18.2 || 1.3 km || multiple || 2001–2021 || 09 Sep 2021 || 40 || align=left | Disc.: Kitt Peak Obs.Added on 30 September 2021Alt.: 2021 QL23 || 
|- id="2001 FD243" bgcolor=#E9E9E9
| 3 ||  || MBA-M || 19.67 || data-sort-value="0.42" | 500 m || multiple || 2001-2018 || 18 Mar 2018 || 35 || align=left | Disc.: Kitt Peak Obs.Alt.: 2018 FJ7 || 
|- id="2001 FH243" bgcolor=#E9E9E9
| 2 ||  || MBA-M || 18.7 || data-sort-value="0.54" | 540 m || multiple || 2001–2019 || 06 Sep 2019 || 35 || align=left | Disc.: Kitt Peak Obs.Added on 11 May 2021Alt.: 2011 SY52 || 
|- id="2001 FL243" bgcolor=#d6d6d6
| 2 ||  || MBA-O || 17.83 || 1.5 km || multiple || 2001-2022 || 02 May 2022 || 39 || align=left | Disc.: Kitt Peak Obs.Alt.: 2022 EH15 || 
|- id="2001 FM243" bgcolor=#d6d6d6
| – ||  || MBA-O || 18.2 || 1.3 km || single || 8 days || 29 Mar 2001 || 8 || align=left | Disc.: Kitt Peak Obs. || 
|- id="2001 FN243" bgcolor=#E9E9E9
| 0 ||  || MBA-M || 17.3 || 1.0 km || multiple || 2001–2021 || 12 Jan 2021 || 86 || align=left | Disc.: SpacewatchAlt.: 2005 GY121 || 
|- id="2001 FU243" bgcolor=#fefefe
| 0 ||  || MBA-I || 17.82 || data-sort-value="0.81" | 810 m || multiple || 2001–2022 || 25 Jan 2022 || 124 || align=left | Disc.: Spacewatch || 
|- id="2001 FV243" bgcolor=#E9E9E9
| 0 ||  || MBA-M || 16.84 || 1.8 km || multiple || 2001–2022 || 21 Jan 2022 || 174 || align=left | Disc.: SDSS || 
|- id="2001 FX243" bgcolor=#E9E9E9
| 0 ||  || MBA-M || 16.34 || 2.3 km || multiple || 2001–2022 || 27 Jan 2022 || 192 || align=left | Disc.: SDSS || 
|- id="2001 FZ243" bgcolor=#fefefe
| 0 ||  || MBA-I || 17.5 || data-sort-value="0.94" | 940 m || multiple || 2001–2020 || 18 Oct 2020 || 133 || align=left | Disc.: Spacewatch || 
|- id="2001 FA244" bgcolor=#d6d6d6
| 0 ||  || MBA-O || 16.7 || 2.5 km || multiple || 2001–2021 || 07 Jan 2021 || 97 || align=left | Disc.: Spacewatch || 
|- id="2001 FC244" bgcolor=#fefefe
| 0 ||  || MBA-I || 17.8 || data-sort-value="0.82" | 820 m || multiple || 2001–2020 || 11 Sep 2020 || 111 || align=left | Disc.: SDSS || 
|- id="2001 FG244" bgcolor=#d6d6d6
| 0 ||  || MBA-O || 16.2 || 3.2 km || multiple || 2001–2019 || 30 May 2019 || 83 || align=left | Disc.: Spacewatch || 
|- id="2001 FH244" bgcolor=#d6d6d6
| 0 ||  || MBA-O || 17.1 || 2.1 km || multiple || 2001–2020 || 16 Mar 2020 || 98 || align=left | Disc.: Spacewatch || 
|- id="2001 FJ244" bgcolor=#fefefe
| 0 ||  || MBA-I || 18.4 || data-sort-value="0.62" | 620 m || multiple || 2001–2019 || 28 May 2019 || 76 || align=left | Disc.: Spacewatch || 
|- id="2001 FL244" bgcolor=#E9E9E9
| 0 ||  || MBA-M || 17.6 || data-sort-value="0.90" | 900 m || multiple || 1993–2021 || 18 Jan 2021 || 105 || align=left | Disc.: SDSS || 
|- id="2001 FO244" bgcolor=#fefefe
| 0 ||  || MBA-I || 18.3 || data-sort-value="0.65" | 650 m || multiple || 2001–2021 || 05 Jan 2021 || 70 || align=left | Disc.: Spacewatch || 
|- id="2001 FP244" bgcolor=#d6d6d6
| 0 ||  || MBA-O || 16.42 || 2.9 km || multiple || 2001–2022 || 25 Jan 2022 || 85 || align=left | Disc.: SDSS || 
|- id="2001 FQ244" bgcolor=#fefefe
| 0 ||  || MBA-I || 17.9 || data-sort-value="0.78" | 780 m || multiple || 2001–2020 || 13 Sep 2020 || 92 || align=left | Disc.: Spacewatch || 
|- id="2001 FR244" bgcolor=#fefefe
| 0 ||  || MBA-I || 18.20 || data-sort-value="0.68" | 680 m || multiple || 2001–2021 || 31 Oct 2021 || 106 || align=left | Disc.: SDSS || 
|- id="2001 FT244" bgcolor=#d6d6d6
| 0 ||  || MBA-O || 16.4 || 2.9 km || multiple || 2001–2020 || 06 Dec 2020 || 76 || align=left | Disc.: SDSS || 
|- id="2001 FU244" bgcolor=#E9E9E9
| 0 ||  || MBA-M || 17.1 || 1.6 km || multiple || 2001–2020 || 12 Dec 2020 || 125 || align=left | Disc.: SDSS || 
|- id="2001 FV244" bgcolor=#E9E9E9
| 0 ||  || MBA-M || 17.2 || 1.5 km || multiple || 2001–2019 || 29 Oct 2019 || 73 || align=left | Disc.: SDSS || 
|- id="2001 FW244" bgcolor=#d6d6d6
| 0 ||  || MBA-O || 16.8 || 2.4 km || multiple || 2001–2020 || 14 Sep 2020 || 70 || align=left | Disc.: SDSS || 
|- id="2001 FY244" bgcolor=#d6d6d6
| 0 ||  || MBA-O || 16.84 || 2.4 km || multiple || 2001–2022 || 27 Jan 2022 || 69 || align=left | Disc.: SDSS || 
|- id="2001 FA245" bgcolor=#d6d6d6
| 0 ||  || MBA-O || 16.2 || 3.2 km || multiple || 2001–2019 || 26 Nov 2019 || 86 || align=left | Disc.: SDSS || 
|- id="2001 FB245" bgcolor=#fefefe
| 0 ||  || MBA-I || 18.67 || data-sort-value="0.55" | 550 m || multiple || 2001–2021 || 12 Sep 2021 || 71 || align=left | Disc.: Spacewatch || 
|- id="2001 FC245" bgcolor=#fefefe
| 0 ||  || MBA-I || 17.6 || data-sort-value="0.90" | 900 m || multiple || 2001–2019 || 01 Sep 2019 || 53 || align=left | Disc.: Spacewatch || 
|- id="2001 FE245" bgcolor=#E9E9E9
| 0 ||  || MBA-M || 16.98 || 2.2 km || multiple || 2001–2021 || 02 Dec 2021 || 108 || align=left | Disc.: SpacewatchAlt.: 2010 MQ101 || 
|- id="2001 FF245" bgcolor=#d6d6d6
| 0 ||  || MBA-O || 16.8 || 2.4 km || multiple || 2001–2021 || 17 Jan 2021 || 86 || align=left | Disc.: Spacewatch || 
|- id="2001 FG245" bgcolor=#d6d6d6
| 0 ||  || MBA-O || 16.79 || 2.4 km || multiple || 2001–2022 || 06 Jan 2022 || 103 || align=left | Disc.: SDSS || 
|- id="2001 FJ245" bgcolor=#d6d6d6
| 0 ||  || MBA-O || 16.5 || 2.8 km || multiple || 2001–2020 || 23 Oct 2020 || 71 || align=left | Disc.: Spacewatch || 
|- id="2001 FK245" bgcolor=#E9E9E9
| 0 ||  || MBA-M || 17.8 || 1.2 km || multiple || 2001–2019 || 06 Sep 2019 || 47 || align=left | Disc.: SDSS || 
|- id="2001 FM245" bgcolor=#fefefe
| 0 ||  || MBA-I || 17.67 || data-sort-value="0.87" | 870 m || multiple || 2001–2021 || 01 Nov 2021 || 51 || align=left | Disc.: SDSS || 
|- id="2001 FN245" bgcolor=#E9E9E9
| 0 ||  || MBA-M || 17.4 || data-sort-value="0.98" | 980 m || multiple || 2001–2021 || 17 Jan 2021 || 101 || align=left | Disc.: SDSS || 
|- id="2001 FP245" bgcolor=#d6d6d6
| 0 ||  || MBA-O || 17.07 || 2.1 km || multiple || 2001–2021 || 26 Nov 2021 || 40 || align=left | Disc.: SDSS || 
|- id="2001 FQ245" bgcolor=#d6d6d6
| 0 ||  || MBA-O || 16.6 || 2.7 km || multiple || 2001–2020 || 11 Oct 2020 || 48 || align=left | Disc.: SDSS || 
|- id="2001 FR245" bgcolor=#d6d6d6
| 0 ||  || MBA-O || 16.93 || 2.3 km || multiple || 2001–2022 || 08 Jan 2022 || 58 || align=left | Disc.: SDSS || 
|- id="2001 FS245" bgcolor=#E9E9E9
| 0 ||  || MBA-M || 17.4 || 1.4 km || multiple || 2001–2019 || 29 Sep 2019 || 67 || align=left | Disc.: SDSS || 
|- id="2001 FT245" bgcolor=#E9E9E9
| 0 ||  || MBA-M || 17.7 || 1.2 km || multiple || 2001–2018 || 14 Mar 2018 || 34 || align=left | Disc.: Spacewatch || 
|- id="2001 FU245" bgcolor=#fefefe
| 0 ||  || MBA-I || 18.7 || data-sort-value="0.54" | 540 m || multiple || 2001–2020 || 13 Sep 2020 || 37 || align=left | Disc.: Spacewatch || 
|- id="2001 FX245" bgcolor=#fefefe
| 1 ||  || MBA-I || 18.6 || data-sort-value="0.57" | 570 m || multiple || 2001–2021 || 04 Jan 2021 || 49 || align=left | Disc.: Spacewatch || 
|- id="2001 FY245" bgcolor=#d6d6d6
| 0 ||  || MBA-O || 16.9 || 2.3 km || multiple || 2001–2019 || 26 Nov 2019 || 55 || align=left | Disc.: SDSS || 
|- id="2001 FZ245" bgcolor=#E9E9E9
| 0 ||  || MBA-M || 17.44 || data-sort-value="0.97" | 970 m || multiple || 2001–2021 || 15 Apr 2021 || 57 || align=left | Disc.: Kitt Peak Obs. || 
|- id="2001 FA246" bgcolor=#E9E9E9
| 0 ||  || MBA-M || 17.93 || 1.1 km || multiple || 2001–2021 || 02 Dec 2021 || 37 || align=left | Disc.: Spacewatch || 
|- id="2001 FB246" bgcolor=#fefefe
| 3 ||  || MBA-I || 18.4 || data-sort-value="0.62" | 620 m || multiple || 2001–2015 || 24 May 2015 || 24 || align=left | Disc.: SDSS || 
|- id="2001 FC246" bgcolor=#E9E9E9
| 0 ||  || MBA-M || 17.4 || data-sort-value="0.98" | 980 m || multiple || 2001–2020 || 24 Dec 2020 || 112 || align=left | Disc.: Spacewatch || 
|- id="2001 FD246" bgcolor=#d6d6d6
| 0 ||  || MBA-O || 16.4 || 2.9 km || multiple || 2001–2021 || 07 Jun 2021 || 117 || align=left | Disc.: SDSS || 
|- id="2001 FE246" bgcolor=#E9E9E9
| 1 ||  || MBA-M || 18.1 || data-sort-value="0.71" | 710 m || multiple || 2001–2019 || 28 Nov 2019 || 62 || align=left | Disc.: Kitt Peak Obs. || 
|- id="2001 FG246" bgcolor=#d6d6d6
| 0 ||  || MBA-O || 16.4 || 2.9 km || multiple || 2001–2021 || 06 Jan 2021 || 92 || align=left | Disc.: SDSS || 
|- id="2001 FH246" bgcolor=#d6d6d6
| 0 ||  || MBA-O || 17.01 || 2.2 km || multiple || 2001–2021 || 20 Mar 2021 || 60 || align=left | Disc.: SDSS || 
|- id="2001 FJ246" bgcolor=#d6d6d6
| 0 ||  || MBA-O || 16.9 || 2.3 km || multiple || 2001–2019 || 04 Nov 2019 || 59 || align=left | Disc.: SDSS || 
|- id="2001 FK246" bgcolor=#fefefe
| 0 ||  || MBA-I || 18.3 || data-sort-value="0.65" | 650 m || multiple || 2001–2019 || 28 May 2019 || 55 || align=left | Disc.: Spacewatch || 
|- id="2001 FL246" bgcolor=#E9E9E9
| 0 ||  || MBA-M || 17.80 || 1.2 km || multiple || 1997–2019 || 26 Oct 2019 || 74 || align=left | Disc.: Spacewatch || 
|- id="2001 FM246" bgcolor=#E9E9E9
| 0 ||  || MBA-M || 17.15 || 2.1 km || multiple || 2001–2021 || 31 Oct 2021 || 114 || align=left | Disc.: SDSS || 
|- id="2001 FO246" bgcolor=#d6d6d6
| 0 ||  || MBA-O || 16.55 || 2.7 km || multiple || 2001–2022 || 24 Jan 2022 || 89 || align=left | Disc.: SDSS || 
|- id="2001 FP246" bgcolor=#fefefe
| 0 ||  || MBA-I || 18.0 || data-sort-value="0.75" | 750 m || multiple || 2001–2020 || 28 Sep 2020 || 60 || align=left | Disc.: SDSS || 
|- id="2001 FQ246" bgcolor=#E9E9E9
| 0 ||  || MBA-M || 17.1 || 1.1 km || multiple || 2001–2021 || 16 Jan 2021 || 86 || align=left | Disc.: AMOSAlt.: 2010 HG34 || 
|- id="2001 FS246" bgcolor=#E9E9E9
| 0 ||  || MBA-M || 17.0 || 1.2 km || multiple || 2001–2021 || 18 Jan 2021 || 71 || align=left | Disc.: SDSS || 
|- id="2001 FT246" bgcolor=#E9E9E9
| 0 ||  || MBA-M || 17.51 || 1.8 km || multiple || 2001–2021 || 07 Nov 2021 || 97 || align=left | Disc.: SpacewatchAlt.: 2010 LS124 || 
|- id="2001 FU246" bgcolor=#E9E9E9
| 0 ||  || MBA-M || 17.1 || 1.6 km || multiple || 2001–2020 || 10 Nov 2020 || 67 || align=left | Disc.: LONEOSAlt.: 2010 DZ52 || 
|- id="2001 FV246" bgcolor=#E9E9E9
| 1 ||  || MBA-M || 17.5 || 1.8 km || multiple || 2001–2017 || 10 Nov 2017 || 33 || align=left | Disc.: Kitt Peak Obs. || 
|- id="2001 FY246" bgcolor=#E9E9E9
| 0 ||  || MBA-M || 17.44 || data-sort-value="0.97" | 970 m || multiple || 2001–2021 || 15 Apr 2021 || 53 || align=left | Disc.: SDSS || 
|- id="2001 FZ246" bgcolor=#E9E9E9
| 1 ||  || MBA-M || 17.9 || 1.1 km || multiple || 2001–2018 || 12 Jul 2018 || 25 || align=left | Disc.: SDSS || 
|- id="2001 FA247" bgcolor=#d6d6d6
| 0 ||  || MBA-O || 17.35 || 1.9 km || multiple || 2001–2022 || 09 Jan 2022 || 37 || align=left | Disc.: SDSS || 
|- id="2001 FD247" bgcolor=#d6d6d6
| 0 ||  || MBA-O || 16.25 || 3.1 km || multiple || 2001–2022 || 06 Jan 2022 || 114 || align=left | Disc.: SDSSAlt.: 2010 ES165, 2017 FQ87 || 
|- id="2001 FE247" bgcolor=#d6d6d6
| 0 ||  || MBA-O || 16.7 || 2.5 km || multiple || 2001–2020 || 20 Oct 2020 || 74 || align=left | Disc.: Spacewatch || 
|- id="2001 FF247" bgcolor=#d6d6d6
| 0 ||  || MBA-O || 16.77 || 2.5 km || multiple || 2001–2022 || 06 Jan 2022 || 136 || align=left | Disc.: SDSSAlt.: 2010 BT37 || 
|- id="2001 FG247" bgcolor=#E9E9E9
| 0 ||  || MBA-M || 17.71 || 1.6 km || multiple || 2001–2021 || 26 Oct 2021 || 75 || align=left | Disc.: Spacewatch || 
|- id="2001 FH247" bgcolor=#E9E9E9
| 0 ||  || MBA-M || 17.6 || data-sort-value="0.90" | 900 m || multiple || 2001–2019 || 06 Oct 2019 || 55 || align=left | Disc.: SDSS || 
|- id="2001 FJ247" bgcolor=#C2FFFF
| 0 ||  || JT || 13.71 || 10 km || multiple || 2001–2021 || 28 Nov 2021 || 153 || align=left | Disc.: SDSSGreek camp (L4)Alt.: 2010 BX47 || 
|- id="2001 FK247" bgcolor=#fefefe
| 0 ||  || MBA-I || 18.8 || data-sort-value="0.52" | 520 m || multiple || 2001–2019 || 25 Sep 2019 || 58 || align=left | Disc.: Spacewatch || 
|- id="2001 FL247" bgcolor=#fefefe
| 0 ||  || MBA-I || 18.43 || data-sort-value="0.61" | 610 m || multiple || 2001–2021 || 26 Nov 2021 || 47 || align=left | Disc.: SDSS || 
|- id="2001 FM247" bgcolor=#fefefe
| 0 ||  || MBA-I || 18.79 || data-sort-value="0.52" | 520 m || multiple || 2001–2021 || 06 Nov 2021 || 46 || align=left | Disc.: Kitt Peak Obs. || 
|- id="2001 FO247" bgcolor=#d6d6d6
| 0 ||  || MBA-O || 16.77 || 2.5 km || multiple || 2001–2022 || 26 Jan 2022 || 57 || align=left | Disc.: Spacewatch || 
|- id="2001 FP247" bgcolor=#C2FFFF
| 0 ||  || JT || 13.94 || 9.1 km || multiple || 2001–2021 || 26 Nov 2021 || 134 || align=left | Disc.: SDSSGreek camp (L4)Alt.: 2010 BR52 || 
|- id="2001 FQ247" bgcolor=#E9E9E9
| 0 ||  || MBA-M || 17.77 || 1.6 km || multiple || 2001–2021 || 07 Nov 2021 || 47 || align=left | Disc.: Spacewatch || 
|- id="2001 FR247" bgcolor=#d6d6d6
| 0 ||  || MBA-O || 17.4 || 1.8 km || multiple || 2001–2020 || 08 Dec 2020 || 61 || align=left | Disc.: Kitt Peak Obs. || 
|- id="2001 FS247" bgcolor=#E9E9E9
| 2 ||  || MBA-M || 18.5 || 1.1 km || multiple || 2001–2019 || 28 May 2019 || 43 || align=left | Disc.: Spacewatch || 
|- id="2001 FU247" bgcolor=#d6d6d6
| 0 ||  || MBA-O || 17.1 || 2.1 km || multiple || 2001–2020 || 14 Sep 2020 || 32 || align=left | Disc.: SDSS || 
|- id="2001 FV247" bgcolor=#d6d6d6
| 1 ||  || MBA-O || 17.1 || 2.1 km || multiple || 2001–2019 || 22 Sep 2019 || 32 || align=left | Disc.: SDSS || 
|- id="2001 FW247" bgcolor=#E9E9E9
| 0 ||  || MBA-M || 17.86 || 1.5 km || multiple || 2001–2021 || 31 Aug 2021 || 31 || align=left | Disc.: SDSS || 
|- id="2001 FY247" bgcolor=#d6d6d6
| 0 ||  || MBA-O || 16.5 || 2.8 km || multiple || 2001–2020 || 14 Dec 2020 || 71 || align=left | Disc.: Cerro Tololo || 
|- id="2001 FZ247" bgcolor=#E9E9E9
| 1 ||  || MBA-M || 18.57 || data-sort-value="0.57" | 570 m || multiple || 2001–2021 || 03 Apr 2021 || 54 || align=left | Disc.: SDSS || 
|- id="2001 FA248" bgcolor=#d6d6d6
| 0 ||  || MBA-O || 16.1 || 3.4 km || multiple || 2001–2020 || 16 May 2020 || 73 || align=left | Disc.: Spacewatch || 
|- id="2001 FB248" bgcolor=#E9E9E9
| 0 ||  || MBA-M || 17.7 || 1.2 km || multiple || 2001–2019 || 28 Oct 2019 || 48 || align=left | Disc.: SDSSAlt.: 2010 FO82 || 
|- id="2001 FC248" bgcolor=#d6d6d6
| 0 ||  || MBA-O || 16.6 || 2.7 km || multiple || 2001–2019 || 28 Nov 2019 || 32 || align=left | Disc.: SDSS || 
|- id="2001 FE248" bgcolor=#E9E9E9
| 0 ||  || MBA-M || 18.65 || data-sort-value="0.55" | 550 m || multiple || 2001–2021 || 03 May 2021 || 70 || align=left | Disc.: Spacewatch || 
|- id="2001 FF248" bgcolor=#d6d6d6
| 0 ||  || MBA-O || 17.05 || 2.2 km || multiple || 2001–2021 || 12 Nov 2021 || 45 || align=left | Disc.: SDSS || 
|- id="2001 FG248" bgcolor=#fefefe
| 0 ||  || MBA-I || 18.5 || data-sort-value="0.59" | 590 m || multiple || 2001–2019 || 24 Aug 2019 || 37 || align=left | Disc.: Spacewatch || 
|- id="2001 FH248" bgcolor=#fefefe
| 1 ||  || MBA-I || 19.1 || data-sort-value="0.45" | 450 m || multiple || 2001–2019 || 14 Jan 2019 || 30 || align=left | Disc.: Kitt Peak Obs. || 
|- id="2001 FJ248" bgcolor=#d6d6d6
| 0 ||  || MBA-O || 17.3 || 1.9 km || multiple || 2001–2020 || 23 Dec 2020 || 31 || align=left | Disc.: Kitt Peak Obs. || 
|- id="2001 FK248" bgcolor=#d6d6d6
| 3 ||  || MBA-O || 17.9 || 1.5 km || multiple || 2001–2019 || 27 Oct 2019 || 25 || align=left | Disc.: Kitt Peak Obs. || 
|- id="2001 FL248" bgcolor=#d6d6d6
| 0 ||  || MBA-O || 16.8 || 2.4 km || multiple || 2001–2019 || 28 Oct 2019 || 58 || align=left | Disc.: SpacewatchAdded on 22 July 2020 || 
|- id="2001 FN248" bgcolor=#E9E9E9
| 2 ||  || MBA-M || 18.6 || data-sort-value="0.80" | 800 m || multiple || 2001–2020 || 21 Oct 2020 || 108 || align=left | Disc.: Kitt Peak Obs.Added on 17 January 2021 || 
|- id="2001 FP248" bgcolor=#d6d6d6
| 4 ||  || MBA-O || 18.3 || 1.2 km || multiple || 2001–2019 || 29 Oct 2019 || 22 || align=left | Disc.: Kitt Peak Obs.Added on 17 January 2021 || 
|- id="2001 FQ248" bgcolor=#d6d6d6
| 0 ||  || MBA-O || 17.8 || 1.5 km || multiple || 2001–2020 || 10 Nov 2020 || 53 || align=left | Disc.: Kitt Peak Obs.Added on 17 January 2021Alt.: 2001 FZ232 || 
|- id="2001 FR248" bgcolor=#E9E9E9
| 1 ||  || MBA-M || 17.4 || data-sort-value="0.98" | 980 m || multiple || 2001–2019 || 02 Dec 2019 || 22 || align=left | Disc.: SDSSAdded on 11 May 2021 || 
|- id="2001 FT248" bgcolor=#fefefe
| 2 ||  || MBA-I || 19.6 || data-sort-value="0.36" | 360 m || multiple || 2001–2020 || 11 Nov 2020 || 24 || align=left | Disc.: Kitt Peak Obs.Added on 17 June 2021 || 
|- id="2001 FW248" bgcolor=#d6d6d6
| 0 ||  || MBA-O || 17.23 || 2.0 km || multiple || 2001–2021 || 29 Nov 2021 || 46 || align=left | Disc.: SpacewatchAdded on 21 August 2021 || 
|- id="2001 FX248" bgcolor=#E9E9E9
| 0 ||  || MBA-M || 17.5 || 1.3 km || multiple || 2001–2020 || 10 Sep 2020 || 43 || align=left | Disc.: Kitt Peak Obs.Added on 21 August 2021 || 
|}
back to top

References 
 

Lists of unnumbered minor planets